= Child protection (disambiguation) =

Child protection, child welfare, or youth protection may refer to:

- Child protection
- Aboriginal child protection
- Safeguarding

== Laws ==
- Adam Walsh Child Protection and Safety Act, a 2006 United States law that created the national sex offender registry
- Child Protection and Obscenity Enforcement Act, a 1988 United States law concerning record-keeping requirements for sexually explicit materials
- Child Protection Registry Acts, state laws creating children's do not call registries
- Child Online Protection Act, a 1998 law restricting what information online entities can collect about children

== Government agencies ==
- Child Protective Services, US government agencies charged with child protection
- Ministry of Youth Protection and Rehabilitation (Quebec)
- Norwegian Child Welfare Services

== Organizations ==
- Office of Child and Youth Protection, the Catholic church's child protection organization
- Youth Protection program (Boy Scouts of America)

== Other ==
- Child Welfare (journal), a journal published by the Child Welfare League of America
