= Fear of children =

Medical term for the fear of children

- Other names: Pedophobia, paedophobia, pediaphobia
- Specialty: Psychiatry

Fear of children, occasionally called paedophobia, is fear triggered by the presence or thinking of children, toddlers or infants. It is an emotional state of fear, disdain, aversion, or prejudice toward children. Paedophobia is in some usages identical to ephebiphobia (although the latter is focused more on adolescent youths and young adults).

The fear of children has been diagnosed and treated by psychiatrists, with studies examining the effects of multiple forms of treatment. Studies have identified the fear of children as a factor affecting biological conception in humans.

== Terminology ==
Paedophobia is the British English spelling, and pediaphobia is another alternate spelling. The terms come from the Greek roots παιδ- paid- (child) and φόβος -phóbos (fear). Pedophobia is not to be confused with pediophobia (fear of dolls) or podophobia (fear of feet).

== Causes ==
Letty Cottin Pogrebin, a founding editor of Ms. magazine, diagnosed America as having an "epidemic of paedophobia", saying that, "though most of us make exceptions for our own offspring, we do not seem particularly warm-hearted towards other people's children." Evidenced more succinctly by the Cinderella effect in evolutionary psychology, this may mostly be explained via kin selection.

One author suggests that the cause of the fear of children in academia specifically extends from adults' distinct awareness of the capacity of children: "Children embarrass us because they point ever too cleverly and clearly to our denial of personal, material, and maternal history."

One report suggests that the source of current trends in the fear of children has a specific source: James Q. Wilson, a professor at UCLA's School of Management, who in 1975 helped inaugurate the current climate of pedophobia when he said "a critical mass of younger persons... creates an explosive increase in the amount of crime."

Sociologists have situated "contemporary fears about children and childhood" as "contributing to the ongoing social construction of childhood", suggesting that "generational power relations, in which children's lives are bounded by adult surveillance" affect many aspects of society.

== Efforts to decrease ==
Efforts to decrease inattention to the needs of children or opposition to youths is a focus of several international social justice movements addressing young people, including children's rights and youth participation. Major international organizations addressing discrimination, either outright or by implication, include Save the Children and Children's Defense Fund. However, some organizations, particularly those associated with the youth rights movement, claim that these movements perpetuate discrimination.

The United Nations has created the Convention on the Rights of the Child, which is implicitly designed to foster intergenerational equity between children and adults.

The influence of the fear of youths in American popular culture is examined by critical media analysts who have identified the effects of pedophobia in both Disney and horror films.

Other authors and scholars, including Henry Giroux, Mike Males, and Barbara Kingsolver have suggested that the popular modern fear of youths stems from corporatisation of mass media and its complicity with a range of political and economic interests. Males perhaps goes the furthest, and wrote an entire book exploring the subject.

== See also ==
- Fear of childbirth
- Adultism
- Ageism
- Adultcentrism
- Youth rights
- Misopedia (hatred of children)
