= Informit =

Informit may refer to:

- InformIT, a subsidiary of British publisher Pearson Education in the US
- Informit (Australia), a subsidiary of RMIT University in Melbourne, Australia, and the owner of Informit (database)
- Informit (database), an online resource owned and managed by the RMIT Informit
