= Youth studies =

Interdisciplinary academic field

Youth studies is an interdisciplinary academic field devoted to the study of the development, history, culture, psychology, and politics of youth. The field studies not only specific cultures of young people, but also their relationships, roles and responsibilities throughout the larger societies which they occupy. The field includes scholars of education, literature, history, politics, religion, sociology, and many other disciplines within the humanities and social sciences. Youth studies encourages the understanding of experiences that are predominantly manifested among young people, generalized phenomenon and social change. The majority of 15- to 24-year-olds in 2008 lived in developing countries. The definition of youth varies across cultural contexts. The social experience and organization of time and space are important themes in youth studies. Scholars examine how neoliberalism and globalization affect how young people experience life, including in comparison to previous generations.

== Topics ==
- Youth voice
- Youth development
- History of youth (category)
- Youth culture
- Psychology
- Youth politics
- Children's geographies
- Youth empowerment
- Youth rights
- Civic engagement
- Youth participation
- Criminalization
- Youth service
- Youth courts
- Youth work
- Adultism
- Adultcentrism
- Ephebiphobia

== Scholarly and academic journals ==
- International Journal of Child, Youth & Family Studies.
- Journal of Youth Studies
- Youth Studies Australia
- Vulnerable Children and Youth Studies
- Journal of Early Adolescence, ISSN 1552-5449 (electronic) ISSN 0272-4316 (paper)

== See also ==
- August Aichhorn
- Australian Clearinghouse for Youth Studies
- Child abuse
- CommonAction
- Forum for Youth Investment
- List of youth topics
- Sociology of the family
- The Wave Trust
- Adolescent suicide

== Bibliography ==
- Bassani, C. (2007) "Five Dimensions of Social Capital Theory as They Pertain to Youth Studies." Journal of Youth Studies, 10 (1) February 2007, pages 17–34.
- Tsekeris, C. and Stylianoudi, L. (2017) "Youngsters and Adolescents in Troubled Contexts: Worldwide Perspectives." Contemporary Social Science: Journal of the Academy of Social Sciences, 12 (3–4) December 2017, pages 165–174.
