= Adultism =

Discrimination favoring adults over children

Adultism is a bias or prejudice against children or youth. It has been defined as "the power adults have over children", or the abuse thereof, as well as "prejudice and accompanying systematic discrimination against young people", and "bias towards adults... and the social addiction to adults, including their ideas, activities, and attitudes". It can be considered a subtype of ageism, or prejudice and discrimination due to age in general.

This phenomenon is said to affect families, schools, justice systems, and the economy, as well as other areas of society. Its impacts are largely regarded as negative, except in cases related to child protection and the overriding social contract. Increased study of adultism has recently occurred in the fields of education, psychology, civic engagement, higher education, and further, with contributions from Europe, North America, and South America.

== Definitions and terminology ==
=== Origin ===
According to one writer, "the term 'adultism' has been varyingly employed since at least the 1840s, when it was used to describe traits of an animal that matured faster than expected." More familiar to current usage, the word was used by Patterson Du Bois in 1903, with a meaning broadly similar to that used by Jack Flasher in a journal article seventy-five years later.

In France in the 1930s, the same word was used for an entirely different topic, the author describing a condition wherein a child possessed adult-like "physique and spirit":

A boy of 12 and a girl of 13 who had the spirit and personality of adults.... They were placed in institutions because of stealing and prostitution. These forms of precocity lead the individual into difficulties and should be recognized early in the development of the individual.

That 1930s usage of the word in France was superseded by a late 1970s American journal article proposing that adultism is the abuse of the power that adults have over children. The author identified examples not only in parents but also in teachers, psychotherapists, the clergy, police, judges, and juries.

=== Usage ===
John Bell in 1995 defined adultism as "behaviors and attitudes based on the assumptions that adults are better than young people, and entitled to act upon young people without agreement". Adam Fletcher in 2016 called it "an addiction to the attitudes, ideas, beliefs, and actions of adults." Adultism is popularly used to describe any discrimination against young people and is sometimes distinguished from ageism, which is simply prejudice on the grounds of age, although it commonly refers to prejudice against older people, not specifically against youth. It has been suggested that adultism, which is associated with a view of the self that trades on rejecting and excluding child-subjectivity, has always been present in Western culture.

Fletcher suggests that adultism has three main expressions in society:

- Attitudinal adultism: Personal feelings, assumptions, and beliefs that form a person's attitudes about young people. This is also called internalized adultism.
- Cultural adultism: The shared attitudes, including beliefs and customs, promoting the assumption that adults are superior to anyone who is not identified as an adult, simply because of their age. This is also called social adultism.
- Structural adultism: The normalization and legitimization of historical, cultural, institutional, and interpersonal dynamics that routinely advantage adults while producing cumulative and chronic adverse outcomes for young people. This is also referred to as institutional adultism.

A study by the Crisis Prevention Institute on the prevalence of adultism found an increasing number of local youth-serving organizations addressing the issue. For instance, a local program (Youth Together) in Oakland, California, describes the impact of adultism, which "hinders the development of youth, in particular, their self-esteem and self-worth, ability to form positive relationships with caring adults, or even see adults as allies", on their website.

Adultism has been used to describe the oppression of children and young people by adults, which is seen as having the same power dimension in the lives of young people as racism and sexism. When used in this sense it is a generalization of paternalism, describing the force of all adults rather than only male adults, and may be witnessed in the infantilization of children and youth. Pedophobia (the fear of children) and ephebiphobia (the fear of youth) have been proposed as antecedents to adultism.

=== Similar terms ===
Terms such as adult privilege, adultarchy, and adultcentrism have been proposed as descriptions of particular aspects or variants of adultism.

National Youth Rights Association describes discrimination against youth as ageism, taking that word as any form of discrimination against anyone due to their age. Advocates of using the term 'ageism' for this issue also believe it makes common cause with older people fighting against their own form of age discrimination. However, a national organization called Youth On Board counters this based on a different meaning of "ageism", arguing that "addressing adultist behavior by calling it ageism is discrimination against youth in itself."

== Causes ==
In his seminal 1978 article, Flasher says that adultism is born of the belief that children are inferior, and he says it can be manifested as excessive nurturing, possessiveness, or over-restrictiveness, all of which are consciously or unconsciously geared toward excessive control of a child. Adultism has been associated with psychological projection and splitting, a process whereby 'the one with the power attributes his or her unconscious, unresolved sexual and aggressive material' to the child – 'both the dark and the light side...hence the divine child/deficit child' split.

Theologians Heather Eaton and Matthew Fox proposed, "Adultism derives from adults repressing the inner child." John Holt stated, "An understanding of adultism might begin to explain what I mean when I say that much of what is known as children's art is an adult invention." That perspective is seemingly supported by Maya Angelou, who remarked:

We are all creative, but by the time we are three or four years old, someone has knocked the creativity out of us. Some people shut up the kids who start to tell stories. Kids dance in their cribs, but someone will insist they sit still. By the time the creative people are ten or twelve, they want to be like everyone else.

== Evidence ==
A 2006/2007 survey conducted by the Children's Rights Alliance for England and the National Children's Bureau asked 4,060 children and young people whether they have ever been treated unfairly based on various criteria (race, age, sex, sexual orientation, etc.). A total of 43% of British youth surveyed reported experiencing discrimination based on their age, substantially more than other categories of discrimination like sex (27%), race (11%), or sexual orientation (6%).

== Classification ==
In addition to Fletcher, other experts have identified multiple forms of adultism, offering a typology that includes the above categories of internalized adultism, institutionalized adultism, cultural adultism, and other forms.

=== Internalized adultism ===
In a publication published by the W. K. Kellogg Foundation, University of Michigan professor Barry Checkoway asserts that internalized adultism causes youth to "question their own legitimacy, doubt their ability to make a difference" and perpetuate a "culture of silence" among young people.

"Adultism convinces us as children that children don't really count," reports an investigative study, and it "becomes extremely important to us [children] to have the approval of adults and be 'in good' with them, even if it means betraying our fellow children. This aspect of internalized adultism leads to such phenomena tattling on our siblings or being the 'teacher's pet,' to name just two examples."

Other examples of internalized adultism include many forms of violence imposed upon children and youth by adults who are reliving the violence they faced as young people, such as corporal punishment, sexual abuse, verbal abuse, and community incidents that include store policies prohibiting youth from visiting shops without adults, and police, teachers, or parents chasing young people from areas without just cause.

=== Institutional adultism ===
Institutional adultism may be apparent in any instance of systemic bias, where formalized limitations or demands are placed on people simply because of their young age. Policies, laws, rules, organizational structures, and systematic procedures each serve as mechanisms to leverage, perpetuate, and instill adultism throughout society. These limitations are often reinforced through physical force, coercion or police actions and are often seen as double standards. This treatment is increasingly seen as a form of gerontocracy.

Institutions perpetuating adultism may include the fiduciary, legal, educational, communal, religious, and governmental sectors of a community. Social science literature has identified adultism as "within the context of the social inequality and the oppression of children, where children are denied human rights and are disproportionately victims of maltreatment and exploitation."

Institutional adultism may be present in:

- adoption of new parents
- access to healthcare
- age of candidacy
- age of consent
- age of majority
- Age-based segregation
- birth control
- cohabitation with relatives/close friends
- compulsory education
- conscription
- curfews
- criminalization
- drinking age
- emancipation of minors in each state/country
- freedom of religion
- military use of children
- over-medicating children
- Policing
- Public school choice
- voluntary employment when legal or approved by parent/the state
- voting age

as well as legal issues affecting adolescence and total institutions.

=== Cultural adultism ===
Cultural adultism is a much more ambiguous, yet much more prevalent, form of "discrimination or intolerance towards youth". Any restriction or exploitation of people because of their youth, as opposed to their ability, comprehension, or capacity, may be said to be adultist. These restrictions are often attributed to euphemisms afforded to adults on the basis of age alone, such as "better judgment" or "the wisdom of age". A parenting magazine editor comments, "Most of the time people talk differently to kids than to adults, and often they act differently, too."

== Results ==
=== Social stratification ===
Discrimination against age is increasingly recognized as a form of bigotry in social and cultural settings around the world. An increasing number of social institutions are acknowledging the positions of children and teenagers as an oppressed minority group. Many youth are rallying against the adultist myths spread through mass media from the 1970s through the 1990s.

Research compiled from two sources (a Cornell University nationwide study, and a Harvard University study on youth) has shown that social stratification between age groups causes stereotyping and generalization; for instance, the media-perpetuated myth that all adolescents are immature, violent and rebellious. Opponents of adultism contend that this has led to growing number of youth, academics, researchers, and other adults rallying against adultism and ageism, such as organizing education programs, protesting statements, and creating organizations devoted to publicizing the concept and addressing it.

Simultaneously, research shows that young people who struggle against adultism within community organizations have a high rate of impact upon said agencies, as well as their peers, the adults who work with them, and the larger community to which the organization belongs.

=== Cultural responses ===
There may be many negative effects of adultism, including ephebiphobia and a growing generation gap. A reactive social response to adultism takes the form of the children's rights movement, led by young people who strike against being exploited for their labor. Numerous popular outlets are employed to strike out against adultism, particularly music and movies. Additionally, many youth-led social change efforts have inherently responded to adultism, particularly those associated with youth activism and student activism, each of which in their own respects have struggled with the effects of institutionalized and cultural adultism.

=== Academic developments ===
A growing number of governmental, academic, and educational institutions around the globe have created policy, conducted studies, and created publications that respond to many of the insinuations and implications of adultism. Much of popular researcher Margaret Mead's work can be said to be a response to adultism. Current researchers whose work analyzes the effects of adultism include sociologist Mike Males and critical theorist Henry Giroux. The topic has recently been addressed in liberation psychology literature, as well.

== Addressing adultism ==
Any inanimate or animate exhibition of adultism is said to be "adultist". This may include behaviors, policies, practices, institutions, or individuals. It is legal in most countries, towards people under 18.

Educator John Holt proposed that teaching adults about adultism is a vital step to addressing the effects of adultism, and at least one organization and one curriculum do just that. Several educators have created curricula that seek to teach youth about adultism, as well. Currently, organizations responding to the negative effects of adultism include the international organization Human Rights Watch.

Common practice accepts the engagement of youth voice and the formation of youth-adult partnerships as essential steps to resisting adultism.

Some ways to challenge adultism also include youth-led programming and participating in youth-led organizations. These are both ways of children stepping up and taking action to call out the bias towards adults. Youth-led programming allows the voices of the youth to be heard and taken into consideration. Taking control of their autonomy can help children take control of their sexuality, as well. Moving away from an adultist framework leads to moving away from the idea that children are not capable of handling information about sex and their own sexuality. Accepting that children are ready to learn about themselves will decrease the amount of misinformation spread to them by their peers and allow them to receive accurate information from individuals educated on the topic.

== Criticism ==
The concept of adultism has been criticised. According to scholar Karen M. Smith, it is merely a "buzzword", that needs to be grounded in theoretical and conceptual literature. She also argues that the notion of children as an oppressed group is still a matter of debate. It has also been argued that it is not a clear or well-defined concept, and that no tools for measuring it have yet been developed.

== See also ==
- Legal age
- Ageism
- Age discrimination
- Children's Online Privacy Protection Act
- Childism
- Adultcentrism
- Ephebiphobia
- Gerontocracy
- Pedophobia
- Prejudice
- National Youth Rights Association
- The Freechild Project
- Taking Children Seriously
- Children's rights
- Youth rights
