= Youth Studies Australia =

- Discipline: Sociology, Education
- Language: English

Publication details
- Publisher: Australian Clearinghouse for Youth Studies
- Frequency: Quarterly

Standard abbreviations
- ISO 4: Youth Stud. Aust.

Indexing
- ISSN: 1038-2569

Youth Studies Australia is a peer-reviewed academic journal published by the Australian Clearinghouse for Youth Studies – also known as ACYS – based at the University of Tasmania. The journal is published quarterly, in hard copy and online in full text for subscribers. The full text of YSA is also available via Informit, EBSCO Publishing, and local libraries in the USA and Australia.

Its content includes "peer-reviewed feature articles that are research- and/or practice-based; abstracts compiled from current national and international scholarly journals; "Practice notes – a column devoted to articles of particular relevance to practitioners working directly with young people; "Peak new" – updates on the activities of Australia’s state and national youth peak organisations; "Youth matters" – items chosen from our news services for their relevance to research contained in the journal; book reviews and updates on Australian Government initiatives in the youth field.

== See also ==
- Australian Clearinghouse for Youth Studies
- Youth studies
- List of youth topics
