= Kate Tilleczek =

Canadian doctor (born 1963)

- Born: 1963

Academic background
- Education: B.A., Wilfrid Laurier University B.Ed, Nipissing University; M.A., Laurentian University; PhD, Human Development and Education, University of Toronto
- Thesis: A multiple method investigation of youth driving culture in Ontario, Canada (2003)

Academic work
- Institutions: Laurentian University; University of Prince Edward Island; York University

Kate Clare Tilleczek (born 1963) is a Full professor at York University and a Tier 1 Canada Research Chair in Young Lives, Education & Global Good.

== Early life and education ==
Tilleczek was born in 1963. Upon earning her Bachelor of Arts degree in Social Psychology from Wilfrid Laurier University, she enrolled at Laurentian University for her Master's degree and Nipissing University for her Bachelor of Education. Her doctoral degree was earned at the University of Toronto.

== Career ==
After earning her PhD, Tilleczek joined the faculty at Laurentian University as an associate professor. She was eventually offered a position with the University of Prince Edward Island (UPEI) in 2009 as a Canada Research Chair in Child/Youth Cultures and Transitions. While at UPEI, she continued her research with the Ontario Ministry of Education to study how children, families and teachers deal with and support the transitions from elementary to high school. Tilleczek also built and founded the Qualitative Research Co-laboratory through funding from the Canadian Foundation for Innovation which then became the Young Lives Research Laboratory (YLRL).

During her tenure at UPEI, Tilleczek and her research team started the Wekimün School Project on Chiloé Island in the south of Chile with an aim to bring a new kind of youth-centred and land based education for human rights to rural island areas in the archipelago. Through collaboration with the Williche youth and their communities, they co-developed a school and curriculum for the Indigenous youth that is based upon their knowledge and life experiences. She was also the recipient of the CEA Whitworth Award for her research on marginalized students and their transitions through the education system.

In 2018, Tilleczek was offered a position as Full Professor at York University in Toronto, along with an appointment as a Tier 1 Canada Research Chair (CRC) in Young Lives, Education and Global Good. While at York, Tilleczek continued to develop the YLRL as a virtual Lab with the intention of removing geographical, linguistic, structural, and technological boundaries to knowledge and learning. As the lead investigator at her Lab, she conducted a five-year long study of youth (ages 16–24) in Canada, Australia, and Scotland to determine whether living immersed in digital technology could harm or benefit them. During the COVID-19 pandemic, Tilleczek also studied how youth used the social media app TikTok to vent their frustrations and its effect on their overall health. However, she also cautioned parents against setting strict limitations to screen time and encouraged them to work with their children to see how they use their online time. She says that "parents need to figure out if what they’re doing online is active, creative, educative or is it just digital junk."

Along with her duties at York, Tilleczek also served on various youth-serving NGO committees including; Pathways to Education Canada, Canadian Education Association Canada, and was a Senior Adjucnt Research Scientist at the Community Health Systems Resource Group at the Hospital for Sick Children (SickKids). She also serves as the Editor in Chief for Bloomsbury Education and Childhood Studies and on the International Advisory Board for Journal of Youth Studies.
