= KIDS Act =

Proposed U.S. legislation

Kids Internet and Digital Safety Act
- Long title: To protect children and teens online, empower parents and strengthen families, and for other purposes.
- Acronyms (colloquial): KIDS Act
- Announced in: the 119th United States Congress
- Sponsored by: House: Brett Guthrie
- Number of co-sponsors: House: 1

Legislative history
- Introduced in the House of Representatives as H.R. 7757 by Brett Guthrie (R‑KY) on March 3, 2026; Committee consideration by United States House Committee on Energy and Commerce, United States House Committee on the Judiciary; Passed the House of Representatives on June 29, 2026 (267–117)

The Kids Internet and Digital Safety Act (KIDS Act) is proposed legislation in the United States first introduced in March 2026. The bill includes parts of legislation such as the Kids Online Safety Act, the SCREEN Act, SAFE BOTS Act, COPPA 2.0, the SPY Kids Act, and more. Notably, it removed provisions from the Kids Online Safety Act that required a duty of care system, but would still require large-scale age verification across social platforms.

Though it is meant to ensure child safety on social networking websites, advocates such as the Electronic Frontier Foundation argue that systems’ relying on government-issued identification or biometric age estimation could chill anonymous speech by discouraging users from sharing sensitive information online.

== History ==
In December 2025, Representative Gus Bilirakis introduced the Kids Internet and Digital Safety (KIDS) Act, which incorporated KOSA and other proposed legislation dealing with use of Internet, social media, and artificial intelligence chatbots by minors. In addition to the KOSA provisions, KIDS would mandate age verification for accessing mature content, require services to implement rigorous controls for accounts belonging to minors, and other similar steps. The bill progressed out of the House Energy and Commerce subcommittee in March 2026. It was introduced again to the House of Representatives by Brett Guthrie on March 3, 2026, and co-sponsored by Frank Pallone on June 23, 2026. It was passed by the House of Representatives on June 29, 2026, by a 267–117 vote.

In June 2026, the House Energy and Commerce Committee reached a bipartisan agreement on an updated version of KOSA, which did not include a "duty of care" standard and included language that would preempt certain state laws concerning child online safety, to be included as part of the KIDS Act.

== Reception ==
In May 2026, 44 attorneys general signed a letter in opposition to the act. Virginia Attorney General Jay Jones described the act as "a wolf in sheep’s clothing," arguing that the measure only empowers social media companies by giving them control over children's social media health.

== See also ==
- Online age verification laws by country
