= Australian Clearinghouse for Youth Studies =

The Australian Clearinghouse for Youth Studies (ACYS) was a not-for-profit organisation funded by the Australian Government Department of Education, Employment and Workplace Relations (DEEWR). Based at the University of Tasmania’s Hobart campus, the clearinghouse acted as both a publishing house on youth studies and as an information service for youth workers and youth researchers, as well as others interested in the study of young people in Australia.

== History ==
With its origins in the early 1980s as the National Clearinghouse for Youth Studies Bulletin based at the Australian National University, the clearinghouse moved to the University of Tasmania after a national bidding process in 1984. Following this move, the National Clearinghouse for Youth Studies Bulletin and Abstracts was distributed on a subscription basis. In 1989 after a change of staff, the bulletin was redesigned and re-launched as a journal, Youth Studies. A year later the journal's title was amended to Youth Studies Australia. In 1998, the National Clearinghouse for Youth Studies became the Australian Clearinghouse for Youth Studies or ACYS. (Source: Flyer about the clearinghouse published in 1995.)

In the 2014 Australian federal budget, the organisation lost its funding in 2014 and finally closed its doors in 2015.

== Functions ==
As a clearinghouse, ACYS synthesised a range of resources, by, for example, digesting the contents of newspaper articles for its "youth monitor" column in its journal, Youth Studies Australia, and by publishing abstracts of key articles in scholarly journals, bringing this information to the attention of the youth studies field. Its journal, Youth Studies Australia, was a platform for researchers and youth workers to publish peer-reviewed research papers and thereby provide material for anyone interested in youth research – policymakers, practitioners and youth work/youth studies students. ACYS also supplied information about youth research, policy and practice in the form of news articles, book reviews, and other products for its multi-disciplinary audience.

From time to time ACYS organised symposia on youth issues.

== Resources ==
ACYS resources included:

- Youth Studies Australia, a peer-reviewed journal that was highly regarded as a source of knowledge on issues affecting Australian and New Zealand young people.
- Youth Field Xpress, a free email newsletter about youth research and youth work issues that contained a wide and eclectic range of news stories drawn from both online and print sources.
- the ACYS website, which was a compendium of helpful information sources on youth issues
- books and other publications on youth issues.

Youth Studies Australia became an online full-text journal in the late 2000s, and its archives are available through the Informit database.
