= Youth perspective =

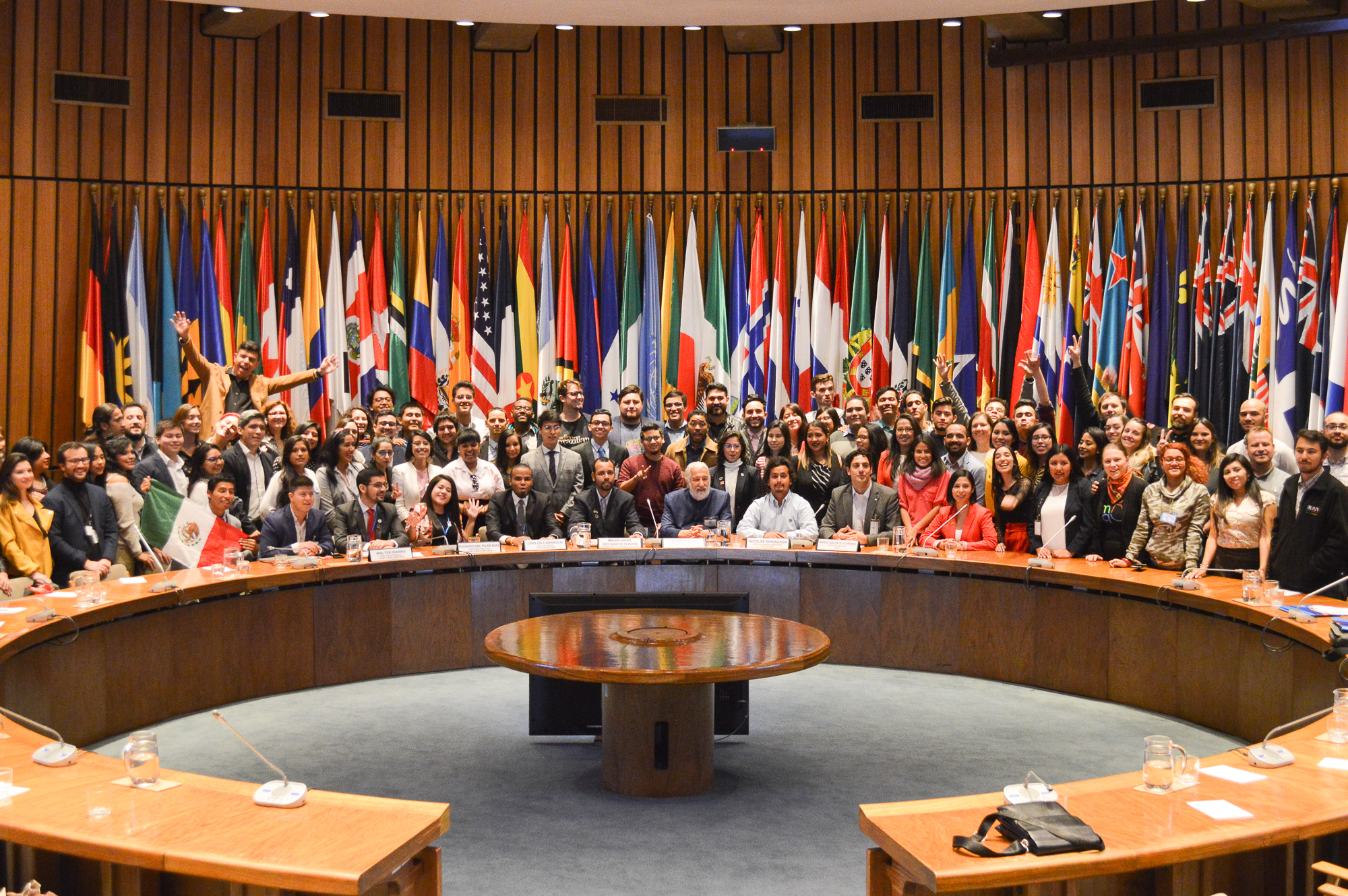
Foro de Juventudes ALC 2030 CEPAL

Youth's perspective is a concept promoted by youth movements, which seek to make visible the barriers youths face to participate, be taken into account, and exercise their rights due to the scheme of adult-centered oppression on which societies have been built in history. It seeks to insert the realities, problems, needs and opinions of young people into the public agenda from the voices of the youths, to promote intergenerational articulation and eradicate the discourses that legitimize the conditioning of rights.

It identifies adultcentrism as a scheme that oppresses young people generating stigmas about who they are and the role they play in societies; a form of age discrimination, known as ageism, that generates asymmetric power relations between the ages, affecting infants, adolescents, and young people by subordinating them to adults who systematically make their needs, problems, experiences invisible; imposing plans, lifestyles; and denying the possibility of weaving bonds of intergenerational solidarity.

In this respect, the youth's perspective opposes adultcentrism by changing the way in which young people were historically named, using the plural "youths", recognizing in young people diverse identities, orientations, contexts, and sociocultural expressions.

Youth perspective rejects the visions and stereotypes that have been historically built on youths, make visible a problem of structural discrimination due to their age and builds a new vision from where they position themselves as subjects of rights (it implies that all their human rights must be recognized, respected and guaranteed, without being conditioned on their age); key development actors (they are not a vulnerable population, but fundamental actors for the development of countries); the present (it is not a stage of preparation for adult life, it is a way of being a person today, valid and respectable); with progressive autonomy (with the ability to decide on their life plans and assume responsibilities gradually, so the responsibility of the State, society and family is to generate the necessary conditions for them to do so).

== Methodology ==
The youths perspective allows the identification, development and promotion of social practices and legal and institutional mechanisms that guarantee that young people are recognized as subjects of rights, with agency capacity and with freedom over their life plans. As a methodology, it has implied a change of paradigm, to stop defining youth from the vision that adults have about them. Lydia Alpízar and Marina Bernal point out that many studies, public policies and laws are carried out by people (adults or young people) who consider that, from their place, they know what young people think, need or feel, without taking into account the opinion of young people. Therefore, the youths have positioned themselves so that the perspective of the youths is incorporated in all the things that involve them under the emblem "nothing about youths without youths".

== Background ==
Lydia Alpízar and Marina Bernal give an account of the different visions made on youth in history as well as the theoretical approaches with which the concept of youth has been approached.

- Youth as a stage of human psychobiological development. This vision has had a great impact on the collective thinking of youth. It defines youth as a problem, a stage of crisis and with a common presence of pathologies. This perspective has generated that youth is seen as a moment of "risk" or "danger", because it defines characteristics of what is "normal" and "abnormal" in the behavior of adolescents and young people.
- Youth as a key moment for social integration. It defines youth as a stage in which young people must be trained and acquire all the values and skills for a productive adult life. Youth is seen as a "transition process", which makes the value of youth invisible in the present and reproduces actions of control and guardianship over youth.
- Youth as a socio-demographic data. It places youth as a group of people who share an age range (which changes by country) that is approached from a population point of view. Although it allows recognizing the importance of youth as a group, it can become statistical data that tends to homogenize them, making invisible the diversity of contexts, needs and realities.
- Youth as an agent of change. This vision is strongly influenced by historical materialism. Studies carried out from this perspective tend to have a very idealistic view of youth, placing this group as "agents" and as motors of the revolution, highlighting and recognizing their contribution to significant processes of social change.
- Youth as a developmental issue. This vision defines youth as a developmental problem, due to the high incidence of unemployment, substance abuse, teenage pregnancy, early marriages, etc. While it recognizes the need to generate specific actions and investments in this age group, it reproduces the stigma of youth as a vulnerable group, hiding the fact that it is the structural conditions that place youth in vulnerable conditions.
- Youth and generations. This vision places the young population on the basis of significant historical events. In this case, youth is defined as a generational group, which is often compared to other generations of young people (who are no longer young). This perspective has generated stereotypes about young people of a certain era, for example, baby boomers, millennials, generation x, generation z.

== Youth as a social construct ==
The most recent perspective is based on theoretical approaches from anthropology and sociology developed in the last thirty years, defining youth as a socio-cultural construct. This means that youth is permanently being constructed and reconstructed, historically. Each society defines "youth" based on its own cultural, social, political, and economic parameters; there is no single or always applicable definition. Thus, as a social construction, traditional views of youth can be transformed, deconstructed and reconstructed, and replaced. José Manuel Valenzuela Arce refers to the youth condition as a category and conceptualizes youth as a historically defined socio-cultural construction. He understands youth identities as products of processes of dispute and negotiation between external representations to young people and those that they themselves adopt. As for Carles Feixa, he distinguishes youth as a transitory condition, unlike other social conditions such as ethnicity, race or gender.

However, the youth perspective uses a life stage approach, which means recognizing that all stages of life are transitory so none can justify discrimination and violence based on age and that what happens at one stage has repercussions on the rest.

== Age ranges per country ==
"Youth" is not standardized to an identical age range in all countries, but each country defines its own and is determined by the social, ethnic and cultural context. The following table identifies the age range in some Latin American countries, the law, and the institute or ministry with which it was determined:

Age range	Country	Law	Institute/Ministry
12 to 29	Mexico	Law of the Mexican Institute of Youth	Mexican Institute of Youth
14 to 26	Colombia	Youth Law °375 of 1997	Presidential Youth Council
14 to 29	Uruguay	Law no. 16170 Ibero-American Convention on the Rights of Young People (Law No. 18270)	National Institute of Youth
15 to 24	Argentina	It is in the bill	National Institute of Youth
15 to 29	Chile	Law 19.042 on the regulation of the youth institute	National Institute of Youth (INJUV)
15 to 29	Peru	National Youth Policy	National Institute of Youth (SENAJU)
15 to 30	Guatemala	Bill 3896, the National Youth Law, is in Congress but has not yet been passed.	National Youth Council (CONJUVE)
15 to 29	Bolivia	Youth Law °342	Plurinational Directorate of Youth in charge of the Ministry of Justice
15 to 29	Venezuela	There is no youths law in Venezuela	Ministry of Popular Power for Youth and Sports
18 to 29	Ecuador	General Law of Youth of Ecuador	National Directorate of Youth and Adolescence in charge of the Ministry of Economic and Social Inclusion
12 to 30	Costa Rica	General Law of the Young Person	National Council of Public Policy for Young People National Youth System

On the other hand, ECLAC publishes the number of young people by country.

== Demographic bonus ==
Latin America and the Caribbean have 165 millions of young people between 10 and 24 years old, according to the United Nations Population Fund (UNFPA), representing the largest demographic bonus, that is, the population of young people has reached its highest level, so young people have and will have a very important role in the direction of countries, governments, economies, cultural practices, etc.

== Intersectionality ==
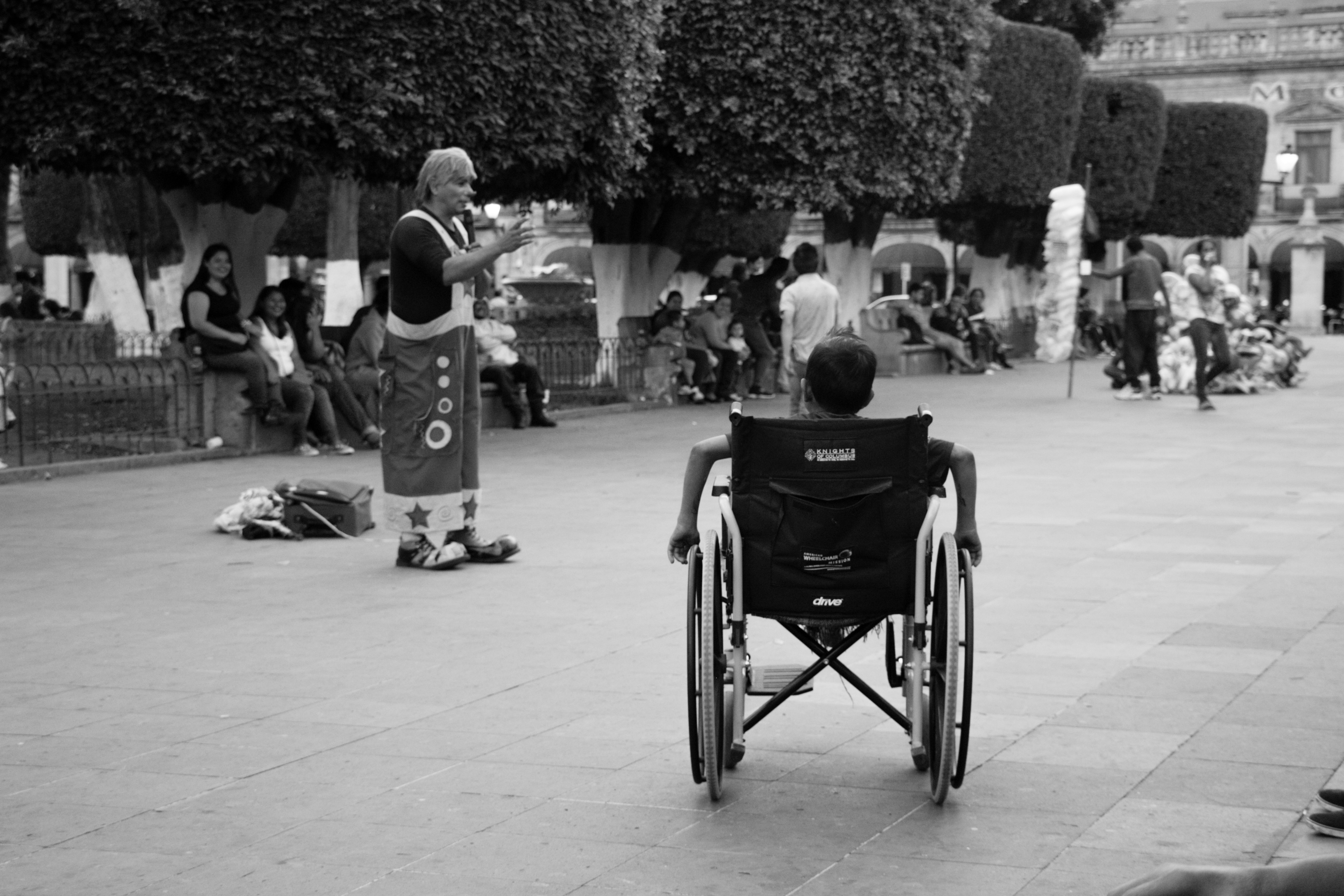

The youths perspective uses intersectionality to identify other conditions such as gender, class, ethnicity, sex-affective preference or orientation, physical or mental condition, among others, which generate differentiated youth experiences that can lead to increased social disadvantage.

=== LGBTTTIAQ+ youths ===
Young lesbian, gay, bisexual, transgender, transsexual, transvestite, intersex, asexual, queer, etc. people are victims of a society based on cis-hetero-patriarchal hegemony and gender binarism that, added to an infantilization towards youths, results in stigmas and prejudices that invalidate their identity and cast doubt on the capacity for self-identification, impeding the right to free development of the personality and their sexual and reproductive rights.

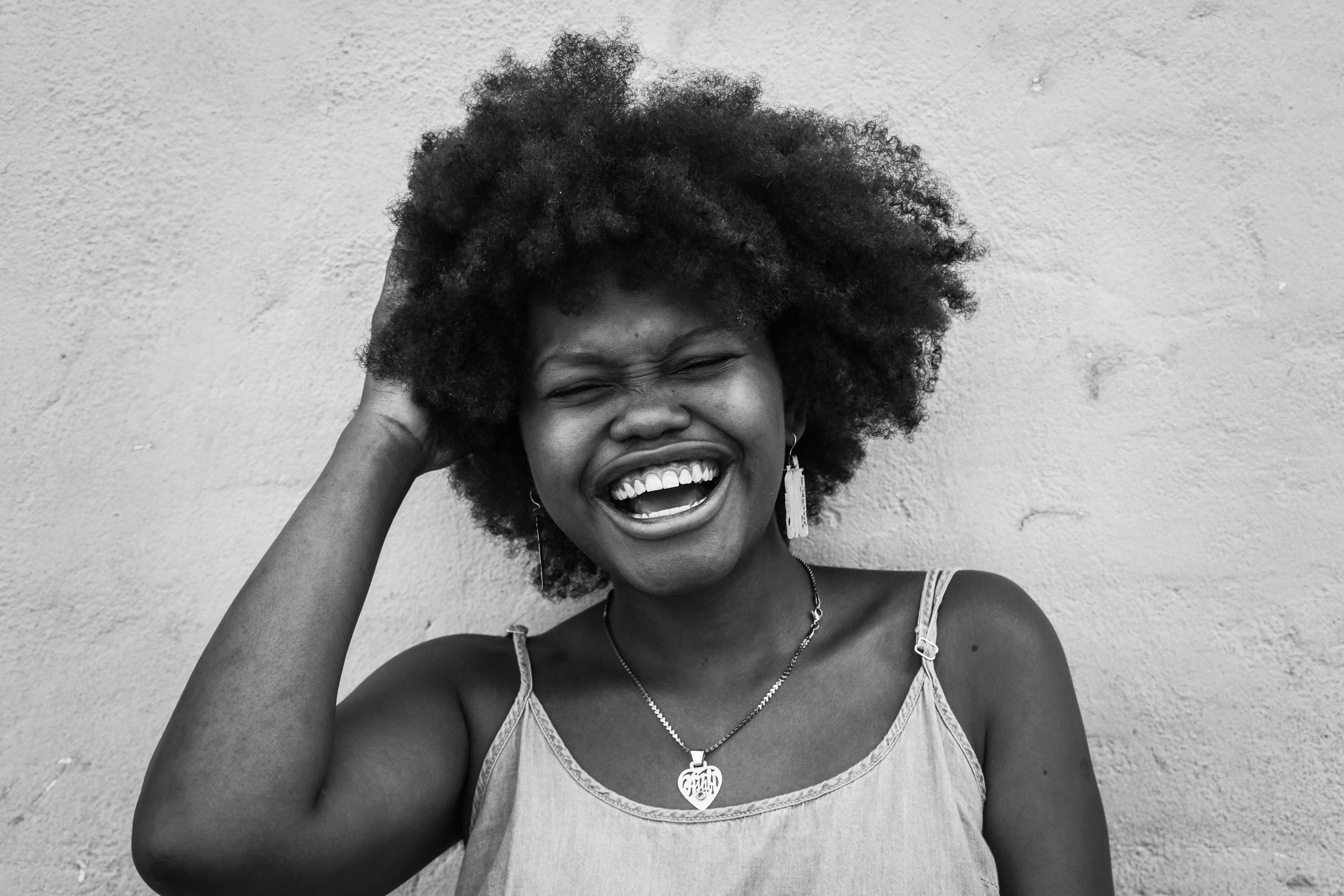
Afro youth

=== Afro-descendant youth ===
The term Afro-descendant was adopted on December 7, 2009, during the Regional Conference of the Americas held in Santiago de Chile. According to Esther Pineda, an Afro-descendant is any person, in whose family nucleus there was one or more people of African origin, regardless of whether or not it manifests itself in their skin tone and body. Similarly, the Afro-descendant person may or may not have knowledge of his or her heritage and regardless of this, recognize himself, deny his Afro-descent or be in the process of such recognition. Afro-descendant youths are all those people who are descendants of the African diaspora who agree the legal frameworks of each country correspond to an age range to be considered young. The Afro-descendant population is considered a vulnerable group, due to the racial discrimination of which it is a victim as a legacy of transatlantic trafficking.

=== Indigenous youth ===
One of the difficulties in recognizing indigenous youths is that the categories "youth" and "indigenous" do not emerge as direct data from reality, but rather are categories constructed from hegemonic and vertical definitions. For this reason, indigenous youths are directly or indirectly violated and discriminated against, both because of their age, as well as for economic and social reasons and conditions. The exclusion of indigenous youths is multiple: violence for residing on their lands, dispossession and displacement forced, barriers to access to education, discrimination based on class or social status, gender violence. They are historical subjects and inheritors of an ethnic history that resists in the present, as well as a political-organizational capacity for participation and defense of their human rights.

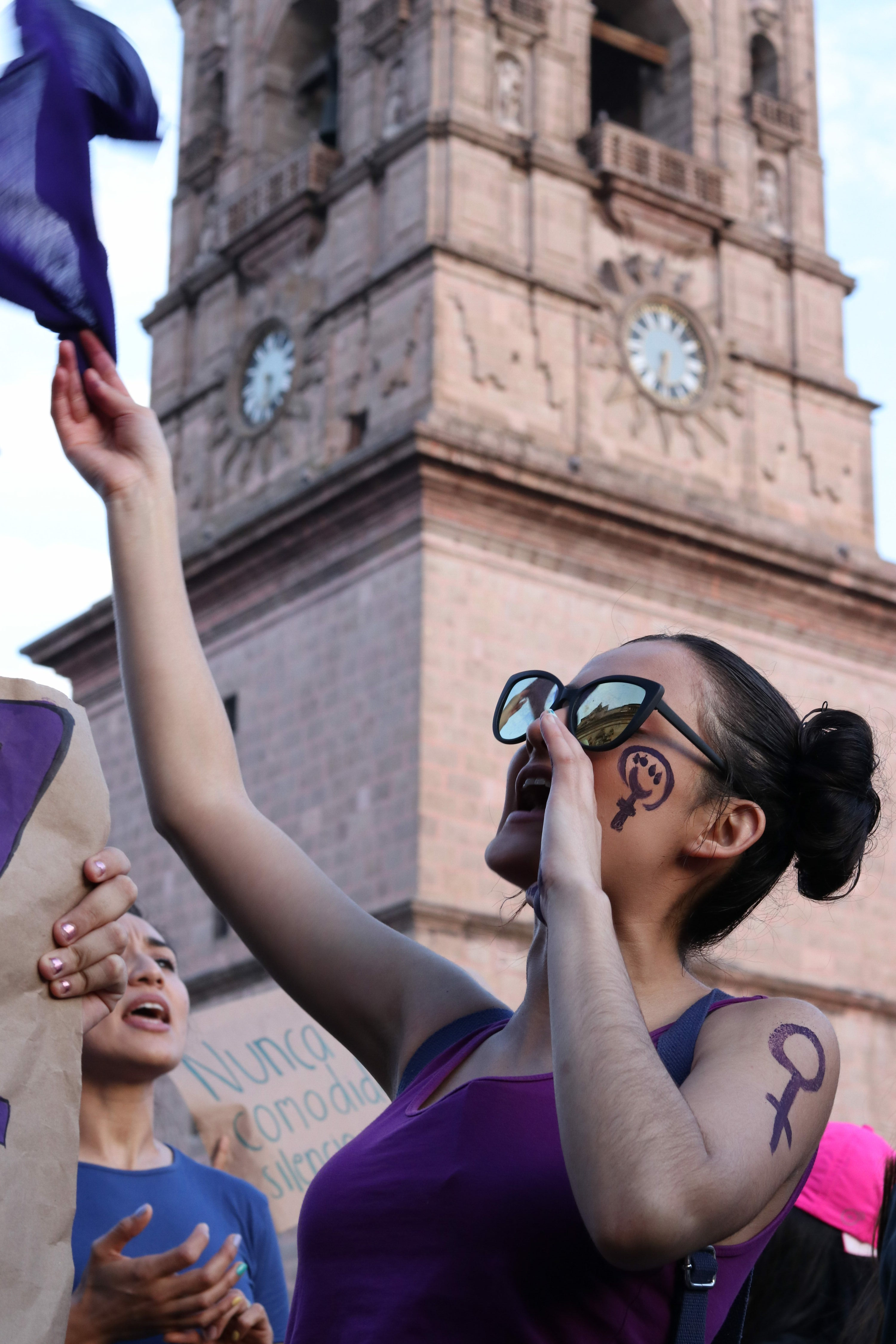
Young feminism

=== Young women ===
Young women suffer from sexist and adult-centered violence, which implies over power, control and repression of their body and sexuality; as well as the imposition of roles, and the submission to hierarchical power relations. Discrimination against young people affects men in the same way, but being women empowers them and multiplies vulnerabilities, suffering double or triple discrimination.

== Issues faced by young people ==
The youths face problems that do not derive from their age, contrary to what the adult-centered vision expresses, but from the social conditions that do not guarantee that they live and travel youth in a dignified way.

Among these problems are: age discrimination, pathologization of youth, patronage of youth, stigmatization, homologation of youth, control and repression, non-intersectional strategies focused on youth, invisibility of their diversity, barriers to active participation in the decisions that involve them, conditioning of their rights due to their age, intergenerational injustices, criminalization, lack of access to public services, imposition of anachronistic schemes / roles, and to a large extent institutional, family and social violence.

== Young people's rights ==
In 2017, Resolution 35/14 of the 35th session of the United Nations Human Rights Council was issued. This official document recognizes and exhorts all UN member states to promote and ensure the full exercise of all human rights and fundamental freedoms of young people.

The human rights of young people refer to the full enjoyment of human rights that all people have by virtue of being people. According to the High Commission for Human Rights (OHCHR), because of their age, young people face discrimination and obstacles that hinder the full enjoyment of their Human Rights, this limits their potential and development. Faced with the conditioning of the rights of young people due to their age, the perspective of youth positions that they are subject to rights and they mobilize so that these are guaranteed. Some of the rights that make up the youth advocacy agenda are:

=== Sexual and reproductive rights ===
The youths take up the principle of "the personal is political" of Kate Millett's feminism, to recognize that the body is the first space where rights are exercised, but when it comes to the young body, there is control and repression of their sexuality, despite being an element present in all stages of life and essential for health. Therefore, they promote the exercise of sexual citizenship, where children, adolescents and youth know their sexual and reproductive rights and demand that these be respected, among them: the right to decide freely, autonomously and informed about their body and sexuality, the right to a life free of physical, psychological and sexual violence, the right to freely and informed decisions about their reproductive life, the right to comprehensive sexuality education, among others found in the Sexual Rights of Adolescents and Young People Book.

=== Environment ===
The youths position the need to guarantee the care and respect of Planet Earth with a youth perspective in the processes of environmental education and information, in citizen participation for decision-making and in access to justice in environmental matters, as well as in the design, implementation and evaluation of any program that affects and modifies human relations with Planet Earth, to face narratives lacking generational justice.

Cristal Cisneros, Director of Evaluation and Impact at Denver Preschool Program, gave a TED Talk at TEDxCherryCreek on October 8, 2020 titled "Youth Perspective on Environmental Justice and Racism".

=== Decent job ===
According to the International Labor Organization (ILO), there are million unemployed youth worldwide and 145 million young workers live in poverty. For this reason, the OIT launched the Global Initiative on Decent Jobs for Youth, It is the first comprehensive effort of the United Nations system to promote youth employment. The objective is to maximize the effectiveness of investments in youth employment and to assist countries in meeting the 2030 Agenda for Sustainable Development.

=== Political participation ===
The youths oppose the clientelization of youths in political parties, which limits their participation to secondary actions and denies their participation in decision-making positions. In the National Youth Agenda, they point out the need to strengthen the participation of youth from their autonomous spaces, considering the different contexts of which they are part; promote the appropriation of youth identity as a political identity; invest in actions that strengthen the capacities of youth and strengthen the tools for their impact on the transformation of their environment, etc.

=== Security and access to justice ===
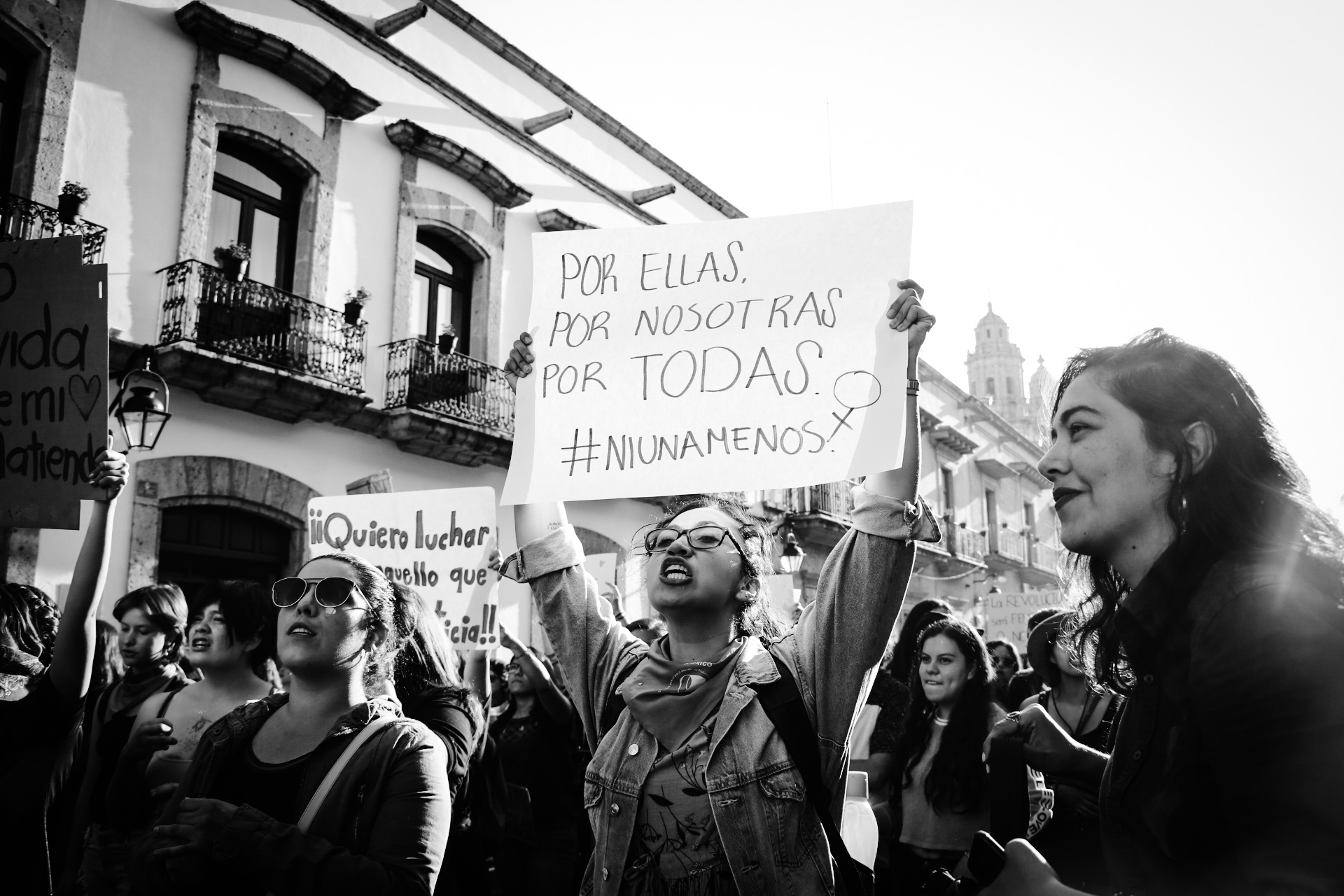
Young women

The youths oppose the criminalization of youths that makes the structural causes of violence and delinquency invisible. They require disaggregated, systematized and accessible data; law enforcement and administration with specialized approaches and a youth perspective; mechanisms for friendly access to justice for children and adolescents; spaces for the participation of young people in shaping local and national security strategies; restorative justice mechanisms with guarantees of non-repetition, comprehensive repair of damages and preventive, etc.

== International treaties and conventions ==
There are international treaties, protocols and conventions where the human rights of young people can be found, even if they are not directly expressed, if they include the clause of non-discrimination by age or any other circumstance, for example:

- Universal Declaration of Human Rights, 1948.
- International Covenant on Economic, Social and Cultural Rights, 1976.
- International Covenant on Civil and Political Rights, 1976.
- American Convention on Human Rights, 1978.
- Inter-American Convention to Prevent and Punish Torture, 1987.
- International Convention on the Rights of the Child, 1990.
- Inter-American Convention on the Elimination of all Forms of Discrimination against Persons with Disabilities, 2001.
- Protocol of San Salvador: Additional Protocol to the American Convention in the area of Economic, Social and Cultural Rights, 2005.
- Inter-American Convention against all Forms of Discrimination and Intolerance
- Yogyakarta Principles, 2007.
- Inter-American Convention against Racism, Racial Discrimination and Related Forms of Intolerance, 2013.
- Convention of Belém do Pará: Inter-American Convention to Prevent, Punish and Eradicate Violence Against Women, 2018.

In addition, there is an Ibero-American Convention on the Rights of Young People, promoted by the Ibero-American Youth Organization. The Convention was adopted by sixteen (16) Ibero-American states in October 2005 and entered into force in March 2008. Its Protocol is in process of ratification by the Ibero-American States.

Ratifying countries	Contracting countries
Bolivia; Costa Rica; Ecuador; Spain; Honduras; Dominican Republic; Uruguay	Brazil; Cuba; Guatemala; Mexico; Nicaragua; Panama; Paraguay; Peru; Portugal; Venezuela

== Protection strategies ==
The recognition of the rights of young people, as well as their condition of vulnerability due to systematic violations, has led to the development of specific protection mechanisms, including:

=== Friendly services ===
Friendly services are a space or place where quality care is provided, considering their age, evolutionary and cognitive development and maturity, and with strict adherence to the provisions of this norm and other applicable provisions, to people in this age group, to help them make free, responsible and informed decisions regarding sexual and reproductive health. According to the ECLAC Youth Observatory for Latin America and the Caribbean, there are 28 countries in the region that have specialized institutions to serve youths.

They are characterized because the care is provided by empathetic, sensitive and trained staff; with confidentiality and privacy, with dignified, equitable and respectful treatment, without discrimination of any kind, respecting human rights, particularly sexual and reproductive rights, with a gender perspective and considering their cultural belonging.

=== Specialized justice ===
Specialized justice implies guaranteeing access to, and provision of, justice with differentiated approaches and a youth perspective; ensuring friendly access mechanisms; guaranteeing the rights to truth and justice; generating disaggregated, systematized and accessible data, by age, sex, gender, ethnic origin and place of origin, on victims, incidence of crime and provision of justice, etc.

=== Best interest of the minor ===
The principle of the "best interest of the child", also known as the "best interest of the minor", is a set of actions that seek to guarantee an integral development (material, affective), that allows to live fully and to reach the well-being and protection of the minor. This principle implies its primary consideration in the design of public policies and in the elaboration of regulations concerning children. The Interamerican Court of Human Rights has pointed out the obligation to fully respect the right of children, adolescents and young people to be heard in all decisions that affect their lives, being not only a right in itself, but one that must be taken into account to interpret and enforce all their other rights.

== Violation of youth rights ==
In recent years, the Inter-American Commission on Human Rights (IACHR) has issued precautionary measures to a variety of people, identified as "young people" or "youths".

== Youth movement for advocacy ==
The youths movement in recent years has promoted the recognition of the role of youths within organizational processes and social changes, generating advocacy at all levels for the incorporation of the youths perspective in the United Nations System, the American System, legislative systems, public policies, initiatives, as well as within academic, governmental and civil society organizations.

=== Global incidence ===
- United Nations Major Group for Children and Youth.
- International Youth Organization for IberoAmerica – OIJ.

=== Regional incidence ===
- Summit of the Americas, 2004, Mar de Plata. First meeting of young people to demand their rights to the states. The summit's agenda included: Expanding employment opportunities for all, with special attention to vulnerable groups, minorities, indigenous peoples, Afro-descendants, people with disabilities, youth and the elderly.
- Escazú Agreement: Within the framework of the second anniversary (2020) of the Regional Agreement on Access to Information, Public Participation and Access to Justice in Environmental Matters in Latin America and the Caribbean (Escazú Agreement), the Champions of Escazú youth program, which seeks to give a voice to youth to guarantee the right to a healthy environment.
- Concausa 2030, it’s an initiative of América Solidaria, UNICEF and ECLAC, where young people from 15 to 17 years old present their social projects focused on the 2030 Agenda to improve social conditions in their territories.
- Girl Up Youth Leadership Summit- Young Women's Leadership Summit.
- Youth Forum of the Americas- OAS / YABT: Youth Forum of the Americas created in 2005 that is constituted as an official platform in the Organization of American States, OAS, for young people in the Latin American region to take the leadership to contribute to the decision-making spaces of their States through proposals and advocacy actions.30
- ALC 2030 Youth Forum at the CEPAL Countries Forum, Chile. Parallel forum, facing the III Forum of countries of Latin America and the Caribbean for sustainable development 2019 of ECLAC, organized by Red LAtm, Hemisferio Sustentable, Caricuao Propone, Defensores do Planeta, Reacción Climate and Juventudes Unidas en Acción. This process brought together the voices of 2,000 young people through local youth tables in 18 countries and 100 young people gathered in Chile, which produced a joint declaration presented to the States.31
- Group of children, adolescents and youth: in the Civil Society Participation Mechanism of the Forum on Sustainable Development of ECLAC. It is one of the interest groups that make up the formal mechanism that civil society has to participate in sustainable development issues.32
- Youth Now! Regional camp of the United Nations Population Fund (UNFPA LACRO). It is a strategy to stimulate work on youth participation in Latin America and the Caribbean, within the framework of the 2018–2021 Global Strategic Plan and the regional investment initiative in adolescence and youth. Two regional camps have been held in Peru (2018) and Mexico (2019).
- Declaration of the Forum of Latin American and Caribbean Youth (Peru). Youth representatives of organizations from 33 countries in Latin America and the Caribbean issued the Declaration of the Forum of Latin American and Caribbean Youth, Within the Third Meeting of the Regional Conference on Population and Development in Latin America and the Caribbean, held in the city of Lima, Peru in 2018.
- Regional Preparatory Declaration of Latin America and the Caribbean for the Nairobi Summit (2019). Gathered in the city of Puebla in Mexico, in preparation for the Nairobi summit.

=== National incidence ===
- National Youth Agenda – South Youth Meeting (Mexico). The National Youth Agenda is the product of the participation and articulation of youths from Mexico in the Juventudes al Sur meeting, held in September 2019 in the city of San Cristóbal de las Casas, Chiapas.
- Citizen Council for the Follow-up of Public Policies regarding Youth- CONSEPP (Mexico). The CONSEPP of the Instituto Mexicano de la Juventud, is a body whose purpose is to know the compliance given to the programs aimed at the youth of both the Institute and the other Secretariats and Entities, give an opinion on them, obtain the opinion of the citizens interested in public policies on youth matters and present their results and opinions to the General Director of the Institute, formulating, where appropriate, the corresponding proposals.
- National camps ¡Juventudes Ya! of the United Nations Population Fund (UNFPA) Strategy to stimulate work on youth participation in Latin America and the Caribbean, within the framework of the Global Strategic Plan 2018–2021 and the Regional Initiative for investment in adolescence and youth, which have been carried out in 17 countries of the region.
- Permanent Youth Forum 2020 (Venezuela). It is a space for meeting, training, dialogue and debate, which seeks to promote a shared vision of a long-term nation in Venezuela.33
