= Barry Checkoway =

American academic

- Occupations: Author, University Professor
- Writing career
- Subjects: Youth participation, Community development, Community youth development

Barry N. Checkoway is Arthur Dunham Collegiate Professor Emeritus of Social Work and Professor Emeritus of Urban Planning at the University of Michigan School of Social Work. Checkoway is internationally renowned for his contributions to the field of youth studies, particularly focusing on community youth development. He is a past recipient of the University of Michigan's Regents' Award for Distinguished Public Service.

== Biography ==
Checkoway has taught at the University of California at Berkeley, the University of Illinois, and the University of Pennsylvania, and was a visiting scholar at the London School of Economics and Political Science and Hebrew University of Jerusalem. He is also the founding director of the Edward Ginsberg Center for Community Service and Learning.

At the beginning of the Clinton administration Checkoway worked closely with officials to develop the Corporation for National Service, particularly on the AmeriCorps and Learn and Serve America programs. He was Founding Director of the Michigan Neighborhood AmeriCorps Program; of the Edward Ginsberg Center for Community Service and Learning; of the Michigan Youth and Community Program; of the Youth Dialogues on Race and Ethnicity; and of the Youth Civil Rights Academy. Checkoway has also chaired the University of Michigan Task Force on Community Service Learning. He received the Ehrlich Prize, a national award for excellence in engaged scholarship.

== Bibliography ==
- (2024) "Youth dialogues on race and ethnicity: Challenging segregation and strengthening diversity." Oxford University Press.
- (2018) "Inside the gates: First-generation students finding their way." Higher Education Studies 8: 72-84.
- (2017) "Adults as allies to young people working for social justice." Queensland Review 44: 521.
- (2015) "Research as community-building: Perspectives on the scholarship of engagement." International Journal of Community Research and Engagement 8): 139-149
- (2013) "Social justice approach to community development. Journal of Community Practice, 21): 472-482.
- (2013) "Four forms of youth civic engagement for diverse democracy. Children and Youth Services Review 35: 1884-1899.
- (2013) "Strengthening the scholarship of engagement in higher education." Journal of Higher Education Outreach and Engagement 17: 7-21.
- (2013) "Education for democracy by young people in community-based organizations." Youth and Society 45: 389-403.
- (2012) "Raising ethnic-racial consciousness: The relationship between intergroup dialogues and adolescents' ethnic-racial identity and racism awareness,"with Adriana Aldana et al.Equity and Excellence in Education 45:120-137.
- (2009) Community Change for Diverse Democracy. Community Development Journal. 44(1) pp. 5–21
- (2006) Youth Participation And Community Change. With Lorraine M. Gutierrez. Haworth Press.
- (2005) "Youth Participation as Social Justice" in Community Youth Development Journal. Fall 2005.
- (2004) Participatory Evaluation with Young People. With Katie Richards-Schuster. University of Michigan School of Social Work.
- (2003) "Involving Young People in Community Evaluation Research." With Dobbie, D., Richards-Schuster, K. Community Youth Development Journal. 4(1), Spring.
- (1999) Youth Participation in Community Planning. With Ramona Mullahey and Yve Susskind. American Planning Association.
- (1995) "Six strategies of community change," Community Development Journal. 30(1). Pp. 2–20.
- (1992) Youth People As Community Builders. With Janet Finn. Center For The Study Of Youth Policy, School Of Social Work, University Of Michigan.
- (1987) Strategic Perspectives on Planning Practice. Lexington Books.
- (1985) The Metropolitan Midwest: Policy Problems and Prospects for Change. With Carl Patton. University of Illinois Press.
- (1983) Skills in Community Practice: A Bibliography. CPL Bibliographies.

== Awards ==
- "Best Feature Award." Journal of the American Planning Association.
- University of Michigan's Regents' Award for Distinguished Public Service.
- Ehrlich Prize

== See also ==
- List of youth topics
