= Kids Online Safety Act =

Proposed United States legislation

- Acronyms (colloquial): KOSA
- Announced in: the 118th United States Congress
- Sponsored by: House: Gus Bilirakis; Senate: Richard Blumenthal
- Number of co-sponsors: House: 64; Senate: 72

Legislative history
- Introduced in the Senate as S. 1409 by Richard Blumenthal (D‑CT) and Marsha Blackburn (R‑TN) on May 2, 2023; Committee consideration by Senate Commerce; Passed the Senate on July 30, 2024 (91–3)

The Kids Online Safety and Privacy Act (KOSPA), known in the House, in some Senate versions, and commonly in the general public as the Kids Online Safety Act (KOSA), is a proposed legislation in the United States first introduced in the Senate in 2022. The bill aims to establish guidelines to protect minors from harmful material on social media platforms through a duty of care system and requiring covered platforms to disable "addicting" design features to minors.

The bill originates from the 2021 Facebook leak, which led to a congressional investigation of Big Tech's lack of protection for minors. Senators Richard Blumenthal (D‑CT) and Marsha Blackburn (R‑TN) co-sponsored the bill and introduced it to the Senate in 2022. It was revived for the 2023–2024 congressional term and while passed by the Senate in July 2024, it failed to advance out of the House of Representatives before the end of the session.

Though KOSA has bipartisan support by politicians, it has been criticized by both liberals and conservatives for potentially enabling censorship, including material important to marginalized groups, as well as material related to racism, abortion, and transgender issues.

== Relationship with COPPA ==
In 1998, Congress passed the Children's Online Privacy Protection Act, which came after concerns about data collection practices towards minors. The legislation set guides on child online safety, notably banning companies from knowingly collecting the data for anyone under 13 without parental consent.

In the years following COPPA, as the popularity of the Internet rose drastically, concerns from parents about the safety of social media arose out of concerns that it was contributing to a mental health crisis among teens, eventually leading to a push for new child online safety legislation.

== History ==
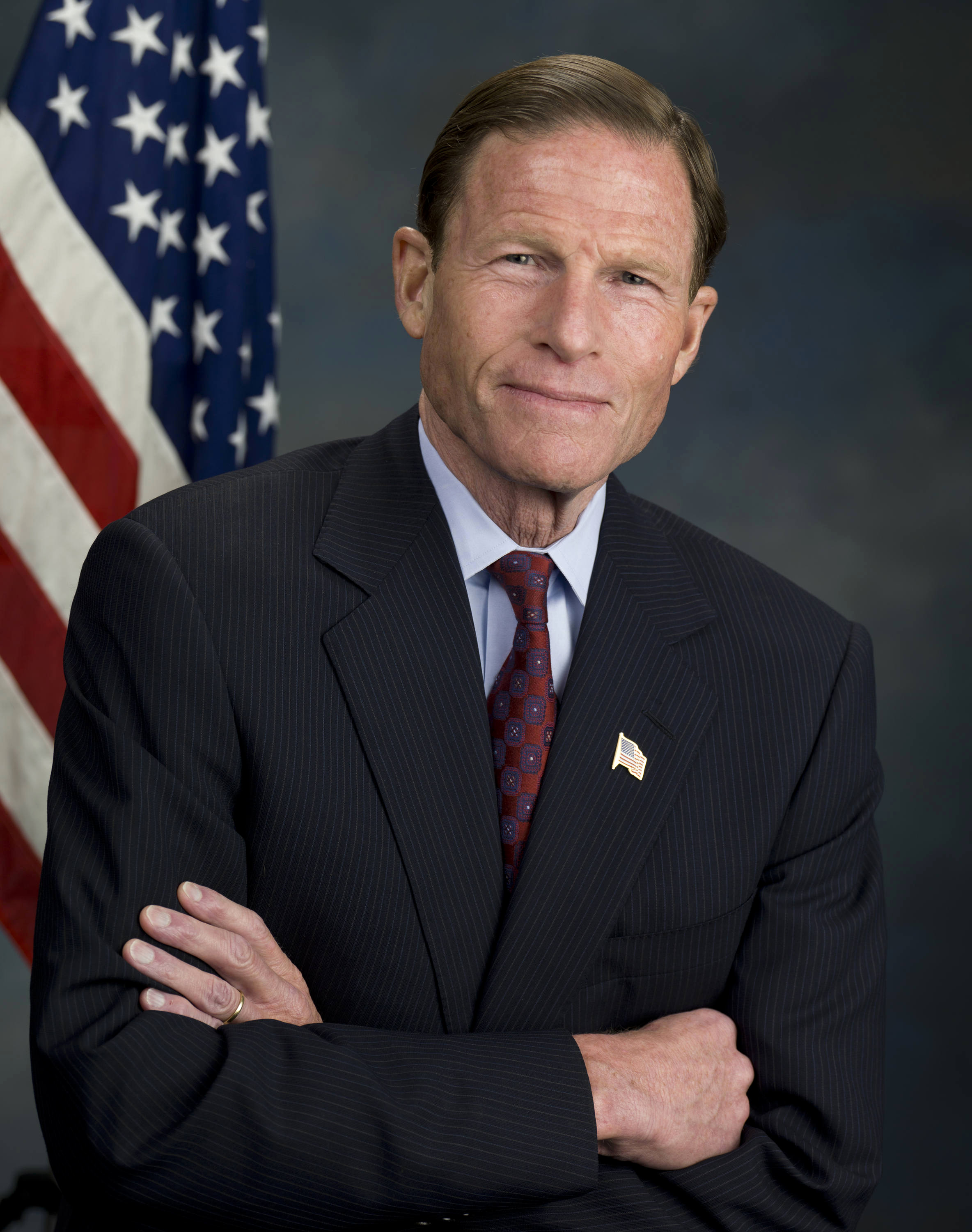
Richard Blumenthal (pictured in 2011)

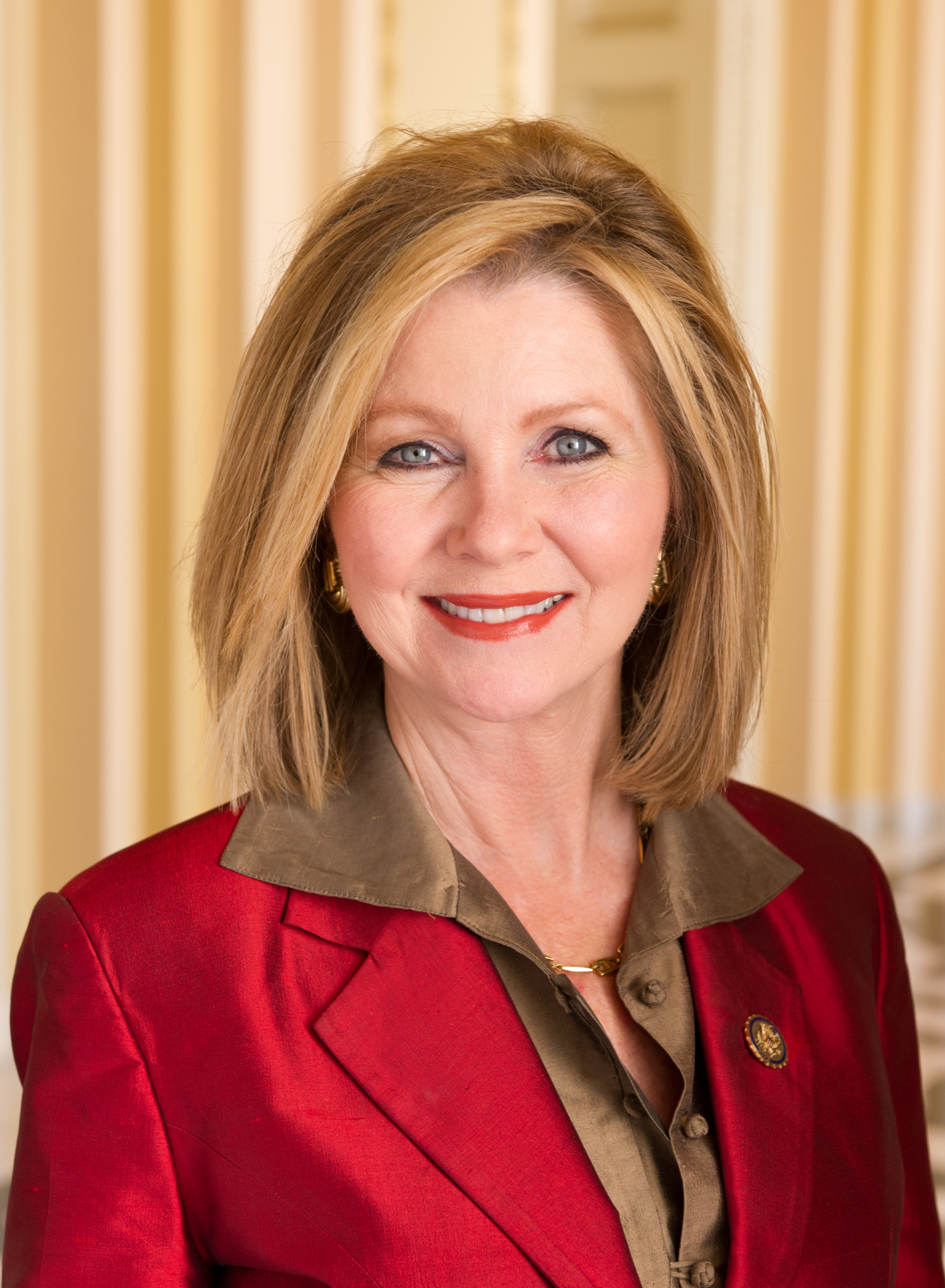
Marsha Blackburn (pictured in 2016)

Senator Richard Blumenthal (D-CT), along with co-sponsor Senator Marsha Blackburn (R-TN), first introduced the bill in 2022.

KOSA was introduced to the Senate by senators Richard Blumenthal and Marsha Blackburn on February 16, 2022. The bill was a direct result after Frances Haugen, a data scientist for Facebook, leaked internal files through The Wall Street Journal in 2021 that showed negative effects of Instagram on minors' mental health, among other topics. The leak led to a Congressional investigation of Big Tech's lack of protection for young users with Instagram CEO Adam Mosseri testifying to Congress in December 2021. Blumenthal, citing the leaked Facebook data, stated that the bill's intention was "not to burn the internet to the ground, not to destroy tech platforms or the internet or these sites; it is simply to enlist the social media platforms in this joint effort to achieve what should be a common goal—protecting children."

The bill was advanced by the Senate Commerce Committee in July 2022, alongside an updated version of the Children's Online Privacy Protection Act (COPPA), the Children and Teens' Online Privacy Protection Act (also known as COPPA 2.0). Both were poised to be passed in the Senate as part of larger legislation near the end of the term for the 117th Congress, but failed to pass.

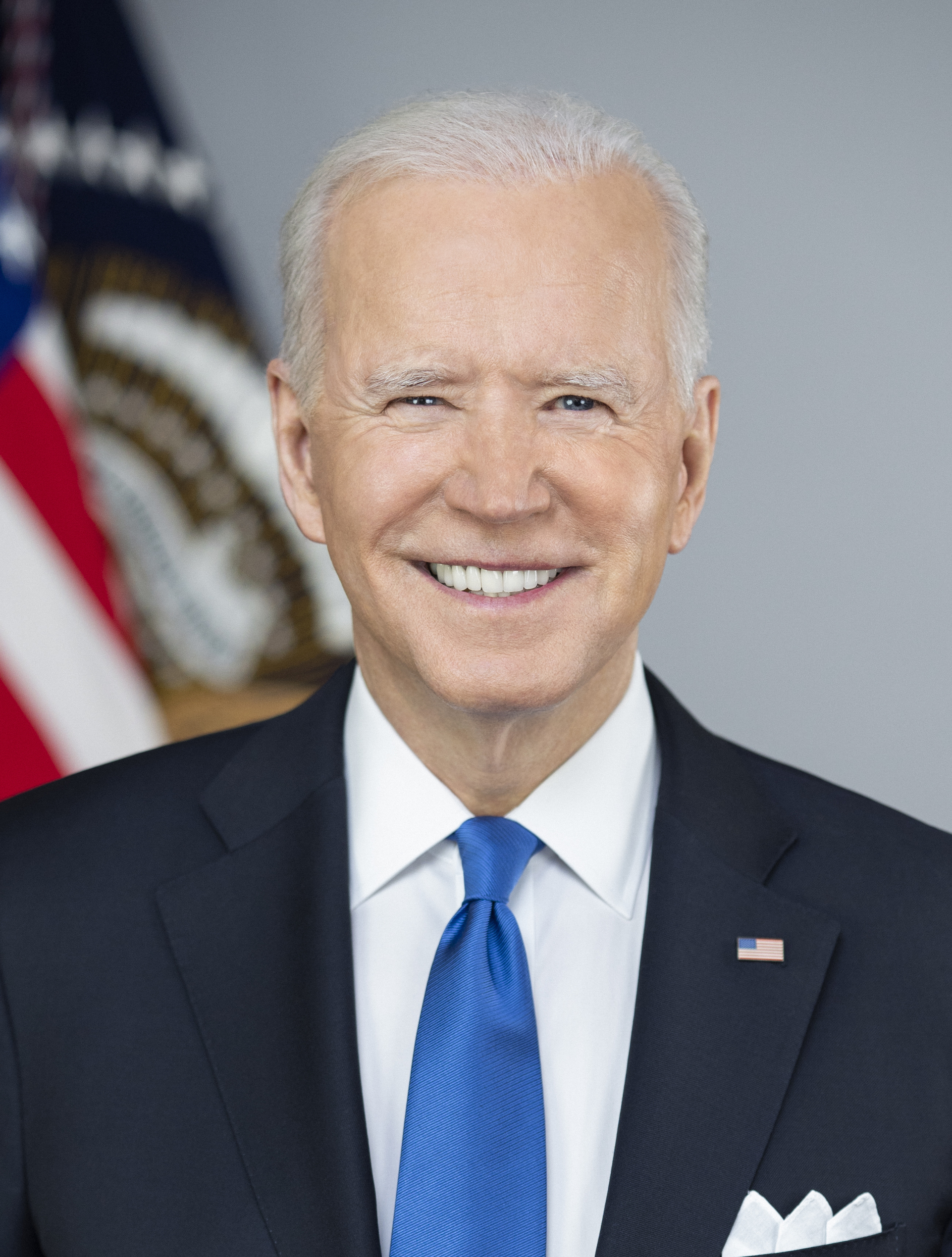
President Joe Biden endorsed KOSA when it was reintroduced in 2023 and congratulated the Senate for passing it the following year.

President Joe Biden pushed Congress to pass legislation to protect children online during his 2023 State of the Union Address, leading Blackburn and Blumenthal to reintroduce KOSA in the Senate on May 2, 2023. KOSA and COPPA 2.0 were approved by the Senate Commerce Committee on July 27, 2023.

In November 2023, whistleblower and former Meta engineering director Arturo Beja testified in congress before a Senate subcommittee hearing about social media and the teen mental health crisis, leading to a renewed push for the bill.

In January 2024, the Senate held a meeting with the CEOs of Meta, TikTok, Snap Inc., Discord, and Twitter regarding child safety. This hearing led to a renewed push for the bill. By February 2024, the bill gained enough backers in the Senate to assure its passage, though there had yet to be a companion bill introduced in the House of Representatives. An attempt was made to append it into the FAA reauthorization act in May 2024. Later, the Senate combined KOSA with COPPA 2.0 and the Filter Bubble Transparency Act into the Kids Online Safety and Privacy Act (S. 2073). After introduction on the 23rd by Chuck Schumer as an amendment replacing the Eliminate Useless Reports Act, the new bill passed by a vote of 91–3 on July 30, 2024.

The House of Representatives had yet to pass their version of the bill by July 2024. A planned markup session for KOSA and other bills by the House Energy and Commerce commission in late June 2024 was abruptly canceled, with speculation that there were disagreements with Republican leaders on a separate privacy bill. In August 2024, Punchbowl News reported that the Republican leadership of the House would not advance KOSA, citing a staffer who referred to "concerns across our Conference".

The bill advanced out of the House Energy and Commerce subcommittee on September 18, 2024, though several amendments focused around the "duty of care" portions of the legislation were added hastily before advancing, creating larger gaps with the Senate version causing some lawmakers to protest or withdraw their support for the bill. No further actions were taken on the bill before the end of the 118th Congress, nullifying its progress. Blumenthal reintroduced the bill in the 119th Congress (2025-2026) in May 2025.

In December 2025, Representative Gus Bilirakis introduced the Kids Internet and Digital Safety (KIDS) Act, which incorporated KOSA and other proposed legislation dealing with use of Internet, social media, and artificial intelligence chatbots by minors. In addition to the KOSA provisions, KIDS would mandate age verification for accessing mature content, require services to implement rigorous controls for accounts belonging to minors, and other similar steps. The bill progressed out of the House Energy and Commerce subcommittee in March 2026.

In June 2026, the House Energy and Commerce Committee reached a bipartisan agreement on an updated version of KOSA, which did not include a "duty of care" standard and included language that would preempt certain state laws concerning child online safety, to be included as part of the KIDS Act.

== Legislation ==
The Kids Online Safety Act, if signed into law, would require Internet service platforms to take measures to reduce online dangers for these users via a "duty of care" provision, requiring Internet service platforms to comply by reducing and preventing harmful practices towards minors, including bullying and violence, content "promoting" suicide, eating disorders, or substance abuse, sexual exploitation, and advertisements for illegal products such as drugs, tobacco, or alcohol.

If signed into law, Internet service platforms would be required to include features that would protect minors and their data, ensure the ability to opt-out of algorithmic recommendations, let minors delete their account and any associated data, restrict communications from non-minors, and disable addictive product features such as autoplay for videos or platform rewards. The bill would also require Internet service platforms to default to the highest possible privacy settings for accounts that belong to minors.

Internet service platforms would be required to introduce tools for parents to better protect their children and make it easier for both parents and minors to report harmful content and to undergo independent, third-party audits and issue public transparency reports detailing possible harms to minors and the efforts to address said harms.

As amended in February 2024, most of the provisions in the bill would be enforced by individual state attorneys general with broader enforcement falling to the Federal Trade Commission, having an oversight over what content is deemed "harmful" to children and enforcing the duty of care provision. In prior versions of the Senate version of the bill, state attorneys general would have enforced the duty of care provisions, but due to concerns from LGBTQ activist groups, it was changed to be enforced by the FTC.

== Legislative history ==
Congress	Short title	Bill number(s)	Date introduced	Sponsor(s)	# of cosponsors	Latest Status
117th Congress	Kids Online Safety Act of 2022	S. 3663, 117th Cong.	February 16, 2022	Richard Blumenthal (D‑CT)	13	Referred to committees of jurisdiction, but never saw a floor vote.
118th Congress	Kids Online Safety Act of 2023	S. 1409, 118th Cong.	May 2, 2023	Richard Blumenthal (D‑CT)	72	Referred to committees of jurisdiction and advanced.
118th Congress	Kids Online Safety Act of 2023	H.R. 7891, 118th Cong.	April 9, 2024	Gus M. Bilirakis (R‑FL 12th)	64	Referred to committees of jurisdiction and advanced, but never saw a House floor vote.
118th Congress	Kids Online Safety and Privacy Act of 2024	S. 2073, 118th Cong.	July 23, 2024	Chuck Schumer (D‑NY)	1	Resolving differences: Senate actions: Senate concurred in the House amendment to S. 2073 with an amendment (SA 3021) by Yea–Nay Vote. 91–3.
119th Congress	Kids Online Safety Act of 2025	S. 1748, 119th Cong.	May 14, 2025	Marsha Blackburn (R‑TN)	75	Read twice and referred to the Committee on Commerce, Science, and Transportation.

== Reception ==
KOSA has received both support and criticism from conservatives and liberals.

KOSA has been supported by Microsoft, X, and Snap; mental health groups, including the American Academy of Pediatrics, the American Foundation for Suicide Prevention, and the American Psychological Association; parental rights groups, including Common Sense Media and ParentsSOS; anti-pornography advocacy and lobbying group NCOSE; the National Education Association; multinational corporation Unilever; (Note: under the Dove brand.) conservative think tank and Project 2025 organizer The Heritage Foundation; fundamentalist Protestant organization Focus on the Family; and rapper and singer Lizzo.

Supporters of the bill argue that the bill will protect kids from harmful content, hold Big Tech accountable for "failing to protect kids", and enable parents access to tools to make minors safer.

KOSA has been heavily criticized by members of the "Don't Delete Art" (DDA) movement, including American Civil Liberties Union, the National Coalition Against Censorship, Fight for the Future, the Electronic Frontier Foundation, the Woodhull Freedom Foundation, libertarian magazine Reason, and anti-abortion group Students for Life.

The DDA has encouraged people to signal their opposition through an online petition that labels KOSA as one of several "Bad Internet Bills". They have criticized the bill for being "too vague" in what it defines as "harmful content" and for potentially expanding the power of the FTC, many have argued that the bill could be used to target marginalized communities (mainly the LGBTQ community), censor free speech protected by the First Amendment, make it harder for minors to search for information on controversial topics like racism, climate change, and LGBTQ issues, and implement ID-based age verification systems.

A letter sent to the United States Congress by Evan Greer, director of Fight for the Future, and signed by multiple civil society groups, warns that KOSA could backfire and cause more harm to minors by overly censoring content due to a lack of specificity as to what constitutes "harm". Fight for the Future has set up a Stop KOSA website for people to sign a petition and contact lawmakers against the bill.

=== Interpretation of harms ===
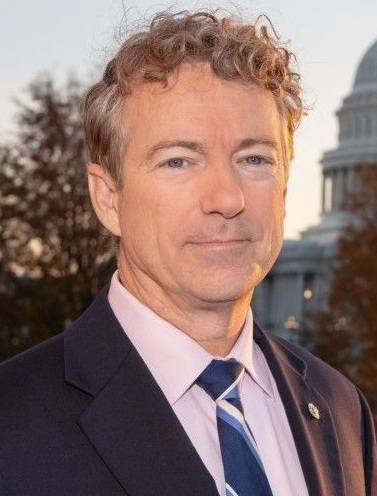
Senator Rand Paul (R-KY) is a staunch opponent of KOSA, once comparing it to a Trojan horse.

Critics, including the EFF, note that the bill's definition of harm toward minors leaves room for broad interpretation by the state attorneys general who are charged with enforcing the bill, with EFF likening it to the FOSTA-SESTA bills. The bill was revised in February 2024 as to shift the enforcement of the "duty of care" aspects of the bill from state attorneys to the Federal Trade Commission, though states would still be able to enforce other parts of the bill. However, advocates have argued that if the president is given the authority to fire FTC commissioners before the end of their terms, as was proposed by Project 2025, the duty of care shift would not effectively address the concerns of broad interpretation.

Republican Senator Rand Paul, who once called it "a Trojan horse", argues that KOSA would be a "Pandora’s box of unintended consequences" due to vague and broad provisions that would allow "nearly limitless content regulation" because platforms would "censor users rather than risk liability". He has also claimed that KOSA would prevent minors from watching PGA golf or the Super Bowl on social media sites because of ads promoting beer and gambling when "those kids could just turn on the TV and see those exact same ads.”

EFF columnist Jason Kelley claimed that in the framework provided by the bill, that KOSA could be used to censor education about racism in schools since it could be claimed that it impacts mental health.

The conservative think tank The Heritage Foundation wrote that the initial 2022 iteration of KOSA did not go far enough, as the bill did not explicitly list transgender health care as a harm. The inclusion of the phrase "consistent with evidence-informed medical information" could be used by attorneys general to cherry-pick anti-trans sources as justification since there is no definition of what "evidence-based medical information" can include. The Heritage Foundation would later express support for the bill, arguing that it could be used to censor transgender information.

In September 2023, a video from the Family Policy Alliance showed Blackburn saying that there should be a priority to "protecting minor children from the transgender [sic] in this culture", alongside her promotion for KOSA, saying "This would put a duty of care and responsibility on the social media platforms, and this is where children are being indoctrinated." This drew criticism from LGBTQ advocacy groups, fearing that the bill would allow LGBTQ information for minors to be censored. A group of 100 parents of trans kids signed an open letter shortly after the comments telling members of Congress to oppose KOSA. A spokesperson for Blackburn stated that KOSA was not intended to censor LGBT information. Democratic co-sponsor Richard Blumenthal stated that the bill "does not target or censor anyone, including members of the LGBTQ community". During the bill's revision in February 2024, the language was updated to provide a definition for "design features" as something that influenced minors' behavior with the platforms, and not the content. As a result, several LGBTQ groups, including GLAAD and GLSEN, dropped their opposition to the bill. (GLAAD changed its position again in 2025, opposing the bill after "changes in FTC and other government leadership".) The EFF, Fight for the Future, and the American Civil Liberties Union found the revisions far from adequate, arguing that LGBTQ content could still be suppressed by targeting any design feature that makes that content available.

=== Possible court challenges ===
Some, like The Verge and the EFF, have argued that the bill could potentially face challenges in the Supreme Court or in lower courts if passed due to First Amendment violations. Similar state bills in Indiana, Mississippi, Texas, and Utah were quickly struck down by their respective state courts as unconstitutional. The NetChoice court case is an indication that KOSA may face challenges in court.

=== Similar bill ===
A similar law to KOSA was vetoed in Vermont by Governor Phil Scott, with his reasoning being that it would likely harm small businesses, violate the First Amendment, and die in court.

== See also ==
- Online age verification laws by country
  - Social media age verification laws in the United States
  - KIDS Act – Proposed U.S. legislation
  - Online Safety Act 2023, comparable legislation passed in the United Kingdom
  - Online Safety Amendment (Social Media Minimum Age) Act 2024, a similar law passed in Australia in 2024
- Regulation to Prevent and Combat Child Sexual Abuse, proposed legislation in the European Union
- EU Digital Service Act
- The Anxious Generation, often used as a catalyst for similar laws
