= Journal of Youth Studies =

Academic journal

- Discipline: Youth studies
- Language: English
- Edited by: Robert MacDonald; Tracy Shildrick; Dan Woodman

Publication details
- History: 1998–present
- Publisher: Taylor & Francis
- Frequency: 10/year
- Impact factor: 1.724 (2017)

Standard abbreviations
- ISO 4: J. Youth Stud.

Indexing
- ISSN: 1367-6261 (print); 1469-9680 (web)
- OCLC no.: 731272242

Links
- Journal homepage; Online access; Online archive

The Journal of Youth Studies is a peer-reviewed academic journal covering youth studies. It was established in 1998 and is published ten times per year by Taylor & Francis. The editors-in-chief are Robert MacDonald (Monash University), Tracy Shildrick (Newcastle University), and Dan Woodman (University of Melbourne). According to the Journal Citation Reports, the journal has a 2017 impact factor of 1.724, ranking it 26th out of 98 journals in the category "Social Sciences, Interdisciplinary".
