= Compulsory Miseducation =

1964 book by Paul Goodman

- Penguin Books edition cover, 1971
- Author: Paul Goodman
- Subject: Education in the United States
- Published: 1964 (Horizon Press)
- Pages: 189
- ISBN: 978-0-394-70325-1
- Dewey Decimal: 370.1
- LC Class: LB1025

Compulsory Miseducation is a critique of American public schools written by Paul Goodman and published by Horizon Press in 1964. Already established as a social critic of American society and the role of its youth in his previous book Growing Up Absurd (1960), Goodman argues in Compulsory Miseducation against the necessity of schools for the socialization of youth and recommends their abolition. He suggests that formal education lasts too long, teaches the wrong social class values, and increasingly damages students over time. Goodman writes that the school reflects the misguided and insincere values of its society and thus school reformers should focus on these values before schools. He proposes a variety of alternatives to school including no school, the city or farm as school, apprenticeships, guided travel, and youth organizations. Reviewers complimented Goodman's style and noted his deliberate contrarianism, but were split on the feasibility of his proposals. Goodman's book was a precursor to the work of deschooling advocate Ivan Illich.

== Background ==
Paul Goodman was an American intellectual and cultural critic who rose to prominence after publishing Growing Up Absurd (1960). In the book, Goodman asserts that the structure of American society was not conducive to the needs of youth. Goodman's subsequent book, The Community of Scholars (1962), and his experience in the classroom, informed his criticism of American schooling and the development of Compulsory Miseducation. The book was initially published in 1964 by Horizon Press, and was later republished by Random House in 1966 and by Penguin Books in 1971.

== Summary ==
Compulsory Miseducation is a critique of the American public school system. Goodman argues against its social necessity and mandatory attendance requirements. He contends that the only "right education" is "growing up into a worthwhile world", and that adult concern over schooling is indicative of an opposite such world. Goodman thinks education should strengthen children's preexisting drive towards refining their own abilities for usefulness in society while developing community spirit. He claims that school, of which there is too much, instead encourages conformity for the good of private, corporate needs at a cost to the public. Goodman writes that America's schools reflect its misguided and insincere societal values, which need to change before schools can.

Goodman criticizes the structure of academic curriculum, and connects it with "programmed instruction" and schooling that emaciates the mind proportional with time. He regards the "academic establishment" as self-aggrandizing and constituting "an invested intellectual class worse than anything since the time of Henry the Eighth." Accordingly, the scholastically inclined, knowing only lockstep, march unquestioningly into "top management and expert adviser" roles while the rest have little self-worth in their societal roles, pursuing "worthless" degrees that make their schooling appear as "a cruel hoax".

In the upper grades and colleges, they often exude a cynicism that belongs to rotten aristocrats.

— Goodman, Compulsory Miseducation

Goodman sees schools as mechanisms for adjusting youth to an automated society increasingly absent "any human values". Goodman disagrees with those who say public schools teach middle class values, as he sees schools as more petit bourgeois than bourgeois, favoring "bureaucratic, time-serving, grade-grind-practical, timid, and nouveau riche climbing" over "independence, initiative, scrupulous honesty, earnestness, utility, [and] respect for thorough scholarship". In this way, schooling is not a good use of student time, and students are right to quit and avoid the psychological and professional damage. More important is the disintegration of social class segregation. Goodman then asserts that lower- and middle-class kids would be better off without public or any schooling altogether. He proposes several alternatives to formal schooling, such as divvying up the high school's public funds directly amongst its students, and advocates for a variety of experimental school alternatives: "no school at all, the real city as school, farm schools, practical apprenticeships, guided travel, work camps, little theaters and local newspapers, [and] community service". Other proposals include making class non-compulsory (such that attendance will reflect student interest without "trapping" children), requiring students to wait two years before applying to the most elite colleges, eliminating grades so the burden of testing for required skills falls on companies, and letting students quit and resume freely. He proposes Danish folk school-style education for those uninterested in academics. Goodman's foremost intention was to stimulate new educational paradigms. He acknowledges that his specific proposals may be unpopular or ignored.

== Reception ==
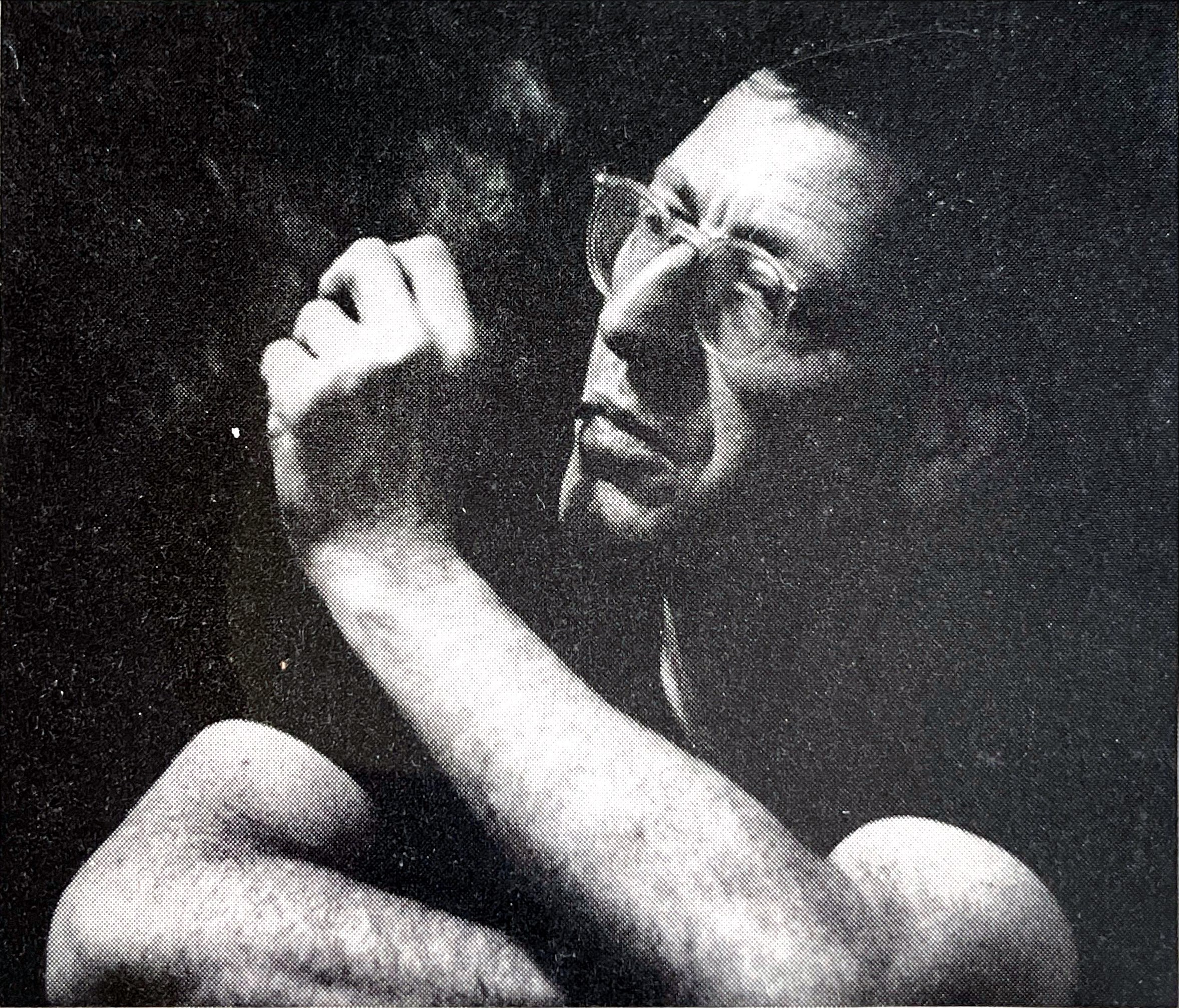
The author, c. 1964

John Keats (The New York Times Book Review) described Compulsory Miseducation as "passionate" and "eloquent". He called Goodman's propositions in the absence of formal schooling "startling" and characterized Goodman as "a lonely humanist crying in a Philistine marketplace, where the largest single share of public wealth is devoted to the strategies of overkill, and where another enormous amount is dedicated to putting blinders on the probable victims." Keats recommended the book for parents who put their children's welfare before their own. Eli M. Oboler (Library Journal), meanwhile, only recommended Goodman's "polemic onslaught" for those who like "contentious [and] disagreeable" material. He wrote that Goodman's approach was unreasonable and contrarian: for instance, his stances in favor of sexual expression and against the importance of literacy in schools.

Edgar Z. Friedenberg (The New York Review of Books) explained the book as a poem by Marianne Moore's definition: "an imaginary garden with real toads in it". By this metaphor, he found Goodman to be a gardener who lacked imagination and forethought but understood growth (the most important trait). Friedenberg compared Goodman with prominent educationist James Conant, whom Friedenberg considered less competent in understanding the conditions of learning. Friedenberg felt that Conant's Shaping Educational Policy complemented Goodman's Compulsory Miseducation, as both shared a common though disparate interest in the distribution of power within schooling structures. While Friedenberg agreed with Goodman's conclusions, he considered them sermon-like in their predetermination, permitting no counter-interpretation. He added that Goodman's "empirical inductive and ... theoretical-deductive" logic was complete and that the work provided little apart from a neat interpretation of the reality within schools and its effect on students' human attributes. Friedenberg wrote that Goodman's proposals are "pertinent, concrete, modest, and inexpensive", practical in their aims, and already implemented on a smaller scale. Furthermore, he concluded that Goodman's argument on how education squandered what it intended to promote was "strong [and] circumstantial".

Nat Hentoff (The Reporter) struggled to disagree with Goodman's claim that schools provided little room for "spontaneity" and free spiritedness. However, he felt that Goodman inadequately explained how primary schools could be improved in content and staffing. Hentoff said that the book's key flaw was its position in a "political vacuum", offering no means for society to acknowledge Goodman's expressed unviability of their schooling model.

Donald Barr (New York Herald Tribune Book Week) wrote that Goodman seemed like "an itinerant peddler of sedition" who spoke of virtuous "dissonance". Barr considered Goodman "extraordinarily sensitive to children and adolescents" and complimented his "brilliant authenticity" when describing how children learn "defiance and embarrassment". However, Barr found Goodman's "purblind resentment of all authority" to obstruct his points and to leave his readers skeptical. Children, Barr wrote, are lost if they cannot find the limits they serve to test, and "partisan" Goodman was unable to parse the wickedness of continually "yielding, ... tolerating, understanding" children who must feel resistance against their transgressions to develop the respect they seek.

== Legacy ==
The book influenced the free school movement of the late 1960s. Nigel Melville (Fortnight) placed Goodman alongside Herb Kohl, Neil Postman, Jules Henry, and Everett Reimer as part of an education anti-orthodoxy, or new orthodoxy under Ivan Illich and Paulo Freire. Bill Prescott (Instructional Science) said the book was "among the most influential" in education circles in the early 1970s. He wrote that Goodman pioneered advocation for deschooling and the disestablishment of schools, which was later popularized by Illich and Reimer (though Goodman's thoughts were less articulate in comparison). In a 2006 retrospective of Goodman's work for Teachers College Record, James S. Kaminsky said that Goodman's four book-length critiques of American education together made Goodman a prominent intellectual and educationist.
