= Office of Child and Youth Protection =

The Office of Child and Youth Protection (OCYP) is an organization of the United States Conference of Catholic Bishops created in the wake of the Catholic sexual abuse scandal in the United States.

The OCYP was instituted as one of the policy recommendations of the Charter for the Protection of Children and Young People It was assigned with three tasks: assisting dioceses and eparchies in implementing "safe-environment" programs for children and young people, assisting regional groupings of dioceses in auditing adherence to the Charter, and finally publishing an annual public report on implementing the Charter.

The OYCP also has the task of noting any dioceses/eparchies considered not to be in compliance with the provisions and expectations of the charter.
