= Adultcentrism =

Exaggerated egocentrism of adults

Adultcentrism is the exaggerated egocentrism of adults, including the belief that an adult perspective is inherently better (when compared to a youth perspective). It is used to describe the conditions facing children and youth in schools, homes, and community settings; however, adultcentrism is not always based on a notion of being good or bad, in contrast to adultism.

== Definition ==
In social work, adultcentrism has been recognized as the potential bias adults have in understanding and responding to children. This bias is said to extend from the difference in age between the child and the adult. The differences—including language, communication styles and world view—can create a hurdle to overcome. Rather than allowing the adult to simply share their view, adultcentrism acknowledges the powerlessness and inability of young people to actually affect the systems of authority adults have created. This creates barriers to effective practice with children; adultcentrism is said to be akin to egocentrism, where one puts their personal perspectives, needs and beliefs ahead of all others, as well as ethnocentrism, which places a person's cultural and social beliefs ahead of all others. Explaining adultcentrism, one author reports,

Adultcentrism contributes to the ongoing difficulty which agencies experience in incorporating into their modus operandi the practice of routine consultation with children about decisions that affect their lives—even after training and policy development about children's rights and participation has taken place.

== Areas of usage ==
In the field of occupational therapy adultcentrism has been said to "lead researchers to underestimate children's abilities." According to one researcher, "This stance can be seen when researchers assume they know everything they need to know about children because they have been children." Research has also shown this leads adults to stay within their own perspective, thus ignoring the child's perspective and discriminating against children through adultism. In respect to occupational therapy, "Adultcentrism has emerged in the family therapy literature to describe the tendency by adults to view the world from an adult perspective and in so doing not understand or appreciate how children and young people are viewing things."

Adultcentrism is also growing in importance in the fields of education, mental health, community sociology, and children's empowerment. One international affairs specialist reflects that,

Children, according to the pillar of adultcentrism, are seen as "the future" and are therefore not yet full human beings capable of making choices. The elderly are considered "past their prime" and are often seen as a burden on society.

From this notion "education leaders, teachers, school board members and reform advocates... call for the same improvements, the same tasks, and the same accountabilities that have been always called for; increased standardization, decreased student motivation, and increased teacher attrition."

A growing number of youth empowerment organizations and youth-led organizations identify adultcentrism as central to their analysis, as well. One such organization, the National Youth Rights Association, identifies adultcentrism in society as a cause that,

...The word "human" evokes the mental image of an adult -- you need to specify if you are talking about a youth. ...The field of "psychology" deals with adults; the study of young people is qualified as "developmental" psychology. ...Stairs, light switches, buses, toilets, the international symbols for "men" and "women" on bathroom doors -- are all designed with adults in mind.

== See also ==
- Ageism
- Adultism
- Fear of youth
- Fear of children
- Fear of childbirth (tokophobia)
- Gerontophobia
- Children's rights
- Youth rights
- Civic engagement
- National Youth Rights Association
- Voting age
- Convention on the Rights of the Child
- Votes at 16
- Mature minor doctrine
