= KidsCom =

KidsCom was a virtual world geared toward kids ages 8–14, first launched in 1995 as a site for kids. After receiving new capital in 2006, Circle 1 Network used those funds to enhance and expand KidsCom – a site that the company describes as safe, fun and educational.

As a result of those funds, the virtual world was launched in 2007 and gathered over 2 million users.

KidsCom primarily allowed kids to learn more about climate change while playing games, and making new friends. At its peak usage, it was praised for its dedication to both fun and learning, whilst teaching a new generation how to look after the Earth.

The KidsCom website was taken offline in 2019 after the parent company, Circle 1 Network, ceased to renew the domain. Its virtual world is no longer accessible.

== History ==
KidsCom was one of the earliest kids-only sites on the Internet, having been online since February 1995. It was an early test site for a large CPG company interested in determining if kids were online. After a very successful test, KidsCom grew into more than just a test site.

On May 13, 1996, the Center for Media Education (CME) filed a petition requesting that the Federal Trade Commission investigate and bring law enforcement action for alleged deceptive practices in the operation of an Internet Web site called "KidsCom," then operated by SpectraCom, Inc. However, the FTC decided not to bring charges and the BBB said that KidsCom is an example of responsible marketing to children.

The FTC decided not to bring any charges or enforcement action against KidsCom for the following reasons:

- KidsCom has modified its website in significant respects. KidsCom now sends an e-mail to parents when children register at the site, providing notice of its collection practices. Parents are provided with the option to object to release of information to third parties on an aggregate, anonymous basis. Most importantly, KidsCom does not release personally identifiable information to third parties without prior parental approval. KidsCom also now discloses to the site visitor the purposes for which it is collecting the information.
- There was no evidence that KidsCom at any time released any personally identifiable information to third parties for commercial marketing or any other purposes.
- The collection of information from children on the Internet is widespread.

The Center for Media Education staff determined not to recommend that the FTC initiate a law enforcement action against KidsCom.
