= Child Protection Registry Acts =

Laws enacted in the United States

A child protection registry or do not contact registry is an electronic database established by statute, to which a parent or guardian may add an "electronic contact point" that is used by or accessible to a child. The statute prohibits certain communications to contact points listed on the registry, and provides criminal penalties for violations of the prohibition.

Child protection registry acts have been enacted in Utah and Michigan.

== Utah Child Protection Registry Act ==
The Utah Child Protection Registry Act, Utah Statutes 13-39-101 et seq., became effective on July 1, 2005. The Act prohibits the sending of a "communication" to a "contact point" that is on the registry for more than 30 days, if the communication either "advertises a product or service that a minor is prohibited by law from purchasing," or "contains or advertises material that is harmful to minors."

A "contact point" is defined as "an electronic identification to which a communication may be sent," and includes an e-mail address, or any of several other types of identifiers, to the extent provided by the Utah Division of Consumer Protection in the Department of Commerce under rulemaking authority granted by the statute, an instant message identity, a telephone number, a facsimile number, or a similar electronic address.

The Department of Commerce has also issued a policy document specifying those products that it deems to be products or services that a minor is prohibited by law from purchasing within the meaning of the statute, i.e., "an alcoholic beverage or product, any form of tobacco, pornographic materials, and any product or service that is illegal in Utah (whether purchased by a minor or an adult), such as illegal drugs, prostitution and gambling."

The Act provides that the consent of a minor to receive such a communication is not a defense to a violation, and that an Internet service provider is not liable for violating the Act "for solely transmitting a message" across its network.

The Act provides that it is a defense to an action for a violation that the violator "reasonably relied" on the electronic registry, and took "reasonable measures to comply" with the Act.

The Utah Child Registry website provides online registration for parents, and for marketers who wish to check their e-mail addresses and other contact points against the database. The Department of Commerce has adopted implementing regulations that charge a fee of $.005 per address checked against the registry, with one-fifth of the fee going to the State of Utah, and four-fifths going to the provider of the registry.

The operator of the registry is UnSpam, Inc., a Utah corporation that also operates the Michigan Child Registry.

A pornography industry trade group brought a legal challenge to the Utah Child Protection Registry Act. A federal judge found the case without merit; the trade group, the Free Speech Coalition, subsequently dropped the case. Free Speech Coalition v. Shurtleff, No. 2:05-cv-00949 (D. Utah Mar. 23, 2007)

== Michigan Children’s Protection Registry Act ==
The Michigan Children's Protection Registry Act, (Michigan Compiled Laws 752.1061) was approved and became effective on July 21, 2004.

The legislation is virtually identical to the Utah Child Protection Registry Act, in that it establishes a registry of child contact points and prohibits the sending of a message to a contact point contained on the registry "if the primary purpose of the message is to, directly or indirectly, advertise or otherwise link to a message that advertises a product or service that a minor is prohibited by law from purchasing, viewing, possessing, participating in, or otherwise receiving." The Michigan Act does not contain the "harmful to minors" language of the Utah statute, however.

Implementing regulations have been adopted by the Michigan Department of Labor and Economic Growth.

The Act provides for the operator of the registry to charge a fee not exceeding 3 cents per contact point checked against the registry, with 85 percent of the fee going to the operator of the registry, and 15 percent of the fee going to the state.

== Controversy ==
UnSpam, Inc., the company that was awarded contracts to operate the Utah and Michigan child protection registries, lobbied for the enactment of the child protection registry acts in those states and lobbied for enactment of similar laws in other states.

In April 2007, the Salt Lake City Tribune reported that the Utah Attorney General's Office agreed to pay some of the attorney fees in defending the legal challenge brought by the Free Speech Coalition. The CEO of UnSpam was quoted as saying that the company could not afford to pay the legal fees involved in defending the lawsuit.
