= Mike A. Males =

American sociologist (born 1950)

- Born: 1950 (age 75–76) Oklahoma City, Oklahoma, US
- Occupation: Author, university professor, social issue researcher, writer
- Genre: Nonfiction
- Subject: Sociology, Youth studies

Website
- home.earthlink.net/~mmales/

Mike A. Males (born 1950) is an American sociologist who is senior researcher for the Center on Juvenile and Criminal Justice, San Francisco, and content director for YouthFacts.org, the online information service on youth issues. He worked for five years at the University of California, Santa Cruz, where he taught Sociology of Men and California Youth in Transition.

Males wrote Scapegoat Generation, a book that analyzes statistics to dispel myths about young people in the 1990s.

== Publications ==
- The Scapegoat Generation: America's War on Adolescents (1996)
- Framing Youth: 10 Myths About The Next Generation (Common Courage Press, 1999)
- Smoked: Why Joe Camel Is Still Smiling (Common Courage Press, 1999)
- Kids and Guns (Common Courage Press, 2001)
- "The New Demons: Ordinary Teens" (Los Angeles Times, April, 2002)
- "What Do Student Drug Use Surveys Really Mean?" (Journal of School Health, January 2005)
- "Wrong Way for Teen Drivers" (Los Angeles Times, January, 2008)
- Teenage Sex and Pregnancy: Modern Myths, Unsexy Realities (Praeger, 2010)
