= Informit (database) =

Australasian information service

Informit is as an online database that provides access to over 100 databases, some of which provide full-text sources. The online versions of the Australian Public Affairs Information Service (APAIS) subject index, and the Australian Public Affairs Full Text (APAFT) are part of the Informit database collection.

Informit is also the name of a subsidiary company owned by RMIT Training, a subsidiary of RMIT University in Melbourne, Australia, which owns and manages the database.

== History ==
The precursor to the Informit databases was a printed series of bibliographic indexes known as the Australian Public Affairs Information Service: A subject index to current literature, compiled and published by the then Commonwealth National Library from 1945, and from 1961 issued by the library under its later name, the National Library of Australia (NLA). In 1972 the name changed to APAIS: Australian Public Affairs Information Service, a subject index to current literature. It was cumulated annually, and published in hardcopy until 2000, after which it was published as APAIS (Online). APAIS (Online) continued to be produced by the National Library until 2013, after which Informit took over its production, management and further development. Informit created online coverage from the printed version backwards to around 1978.

APAIS still exists, described as "a subject index to scholarly articles in the social sciences and humanities published in Australia, and to selected journal articles, conference papers, books and newspaper articles on Australian economic, social, political and cultural affairs". Approximately 12,000 new articles continue to be indexed each year, on topics such as diverse as Aboriginal studies, anthropology and archaeology; business, accounting, management; health; history; law; and religion.

== Informit databases ==
Apart from APAIS, Informit also includes a range of other online products. According to its website in 2020, its databases contain "over 8 million records from 100 databases of expert-curated, peer-reviewed content", to benefit students and researchers of all kinds. It originally built its online platform for RMIT students, and staff, but now provides information on a subscription basis to anyone. It collaborates with libraries, governments, publishers and others around the world, and clients include the British Library, the European Union's Agency for the Cooperation of Energy Regulators (ACER), Oxford University and the Australia Council.

The databases, numbering over 100, are grouped into four main sections by Informit: full-text, backfiles, index-only databases and media databases.

The full text section includes Australian Public Affairs Full Text, also known as APAFT, which includes full-text articles back to 1994, and index records back to 1978. Other full-text databases include the Asia Collection and AGIS Plus Text (a multi-disciplinary database covering law-related topics).

The Informit Literature & Culture Collection Backfiles includes cultural and literary magazines magazines dating from 1939 until 2004. Titles include Meanjin, Quadrant and Southerly.

The Index Databases include approximately 70 indexes to print journals.

The media database group includes two products, EduTV (containing indexed coverage of education- and media-related TV programmes since 2006) and TVNews (covering news and current affairs and TV documentaries since 2007).

== Access ==
The National Library provides online access to APAIS and APAFT. The State Library of Queensland provides access to APAFT both on-site or at home for library members. and the State Library of South Australia provides unlimited access to many Informit services on-site or at home for library members.
