= Fiction of Paul Goodman =

Stories, novels, drama, and poetry of Paul Goodman

Paul Goodman's oeuvre spanned fiction, poetry, drama, social criticism, psychoanalytic theory, and literary analysis. While he viewed himself as a man of letters, he prized his stories and poems above his other work. To Goodman, writing was "his vice" or "way of being in the world".

== Background ==
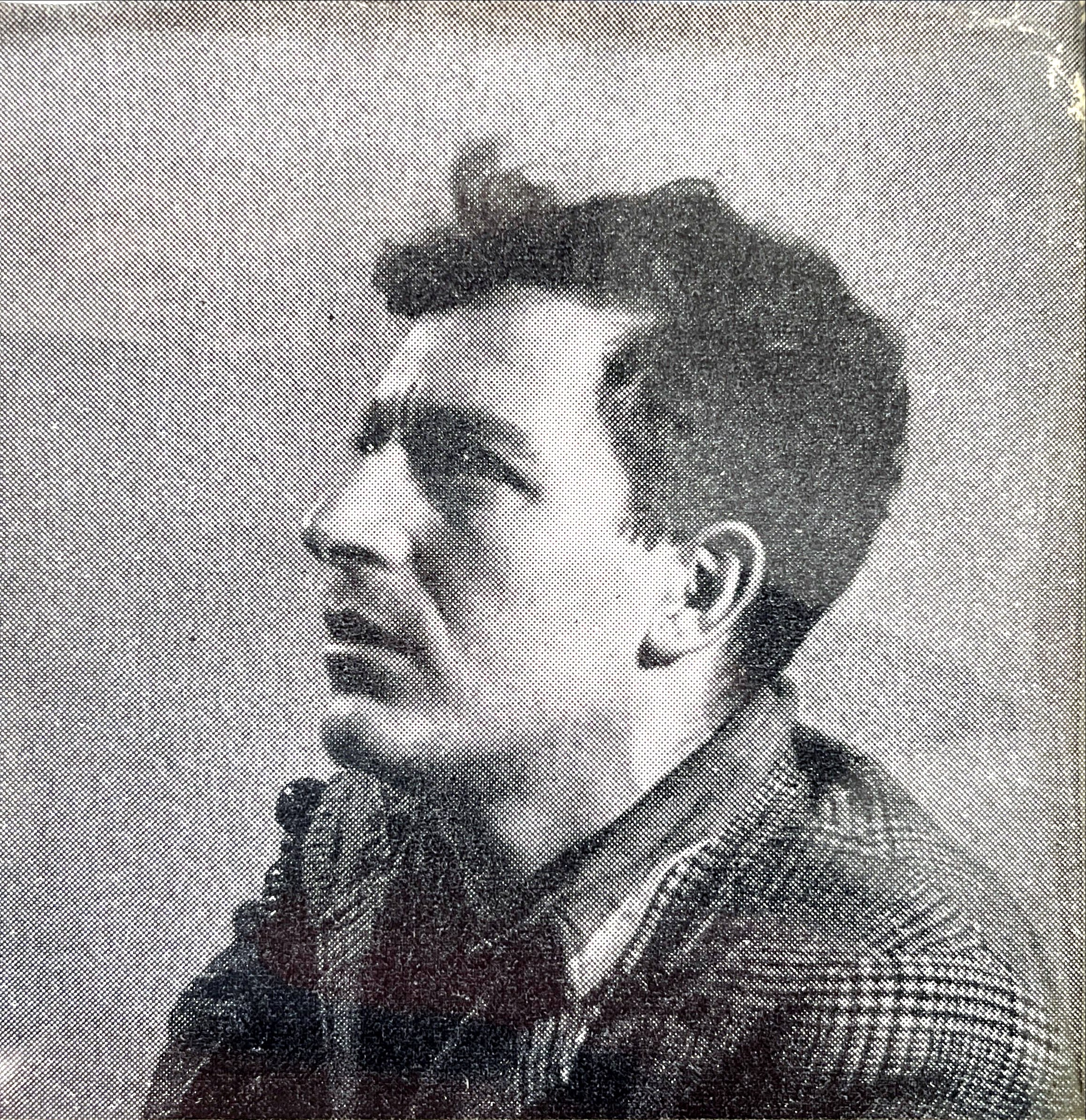
Goodman during the late 1940s, his literary era

Goodman began to write stories in high school. He often composed in pencil on scraps that he carried. Goodman wrote his stories on cheap newsprint and his longhand filled every available space, to its edges. He typed his second draft and might pencil corrections before sending it for editing. Goodman's passion was for writing, not finishing. He continually returned to his works and was known to make revisions in printed editions even when the work had no plans for re-release. He would receive criticism for revising some works dozens of years after their publication, "spoiling their favorites". For the first half of his life, Goodman thought he did his best work in the middle of the night. He attempted a rhythm of writing at least a page daily such that he would have frequent temptation to lose himself in the work. This daily calisthenic of finishing a thought at his own pace contributed to Goodman's prolific output. Goodman's story manuscripts read as rhapsodic episodes, showing few pauses and fitting together like a prose poem.

In his early years, Goodman also wrote scenes in the style of Guy de Maupassant, was accused of imitating James Joyce, and explored the styles of Ring Lardner, Jean Cocteau, and Pierre Mac Orlan. But Goodman's literary executor, Taylor Stoehr, likened Goodman's style to Nathaniel Hawthorne most of all.

Much of Goodman's fiction was based on his life and as a result, included self-examination among its themes. Johnson and The Break-Up of Our Camp, written after his college graduation, were based on a romantic interest and Jewish boys' camp where Goodman was a counselor. Some chapters of these novels-in-stories were published in magazines.

In the late 1930s, after moving to Chicago, Goodman reconsidered his approach to fiction and wrote a dozen works of prose in a style he termed "cubist", in which he abstracted its formal/literary elements as alienated from mere character relations. Of these stories, "A Ceremonial", received the most critical attention, but Klaus Mann saw serenity where Goodman had intended an alienated tone. Goodman received fair recognition within New York literary circles into 1940 as he published in multiple magazines, but many opportunities soon fell through, particularly as Goodman made enemies with his aggressive World War II pacifism. Goodman's Japanese Noh plays, Stop-Light, released a week after the attack on Pearl Harbor. The Grand Piano, his antiwar novel, fell flat against the Philippines campaign. After publishing little in 1943 and being fired for seducing his students, Goodman was becoming notorious.

Small presses continued to publish his works, but Goodman was bothered by his self-image as an embattled writer alienated from society, both well-published and unknown at once. While continuing to write over 100 stories, plays, essays, and constant poems throughout the 1940s, Goodman channeled his troubles into his writing and focused on the social issues associated with his alienation—politics, psychosexuality, religion—and wrote on topics including education, anarchism ("The May Pamphlet"), and civic design (Communitas). Meanwhile, in his fiction, Goodman's epic novel project The Empire City was an inward-looking satire subtitled "An Almanac of Alienation". He wrote it as a series of heroic portraits whose characters were abstractions of "sociological and psychological causes". In his short stories, Goodman removed conventional plot, character, and setting as familial essays with his self-styled "cubist" literary emphasis on formal manner. He called these styles "expressionistic naturalism" and "dialectical lyrics", respectively, though the literary experiments outgrew the label. He stopped categorizing his career stages upon growing comfortable with his stature in the field.

In the mid-1940s, Goodman's stories became more polemical in indignant self-defense of his provocative lifestyle, though as he entered therapy, the stories became self-critical and reflective of psychoanalytic ideas. In one work, he remarked that "disparaging the ego" and hatred of self were the core theme of his stories. In "Incidents of the Labyrinth", an allegory of soul-searching in the myth of the Labyrinth, Goodman recounted how those who search for the meaning of life (or others who ask those questions) are likely to be unhappy. His late-1940s stories were part of his self-analysis (e.g., free analysis and childhood memories) with fewer formal devices, more openings to the unconscious, and clear analogies of inward searching.

Goodman came to see his fiction as "myths" in the 1950s, either by finding something mythical in a traditional American scene or in finding something familiar in an ancient, foreign myth. In these works, Goodman wrote about rescuers and doctors who save their victims but not themselves. In this period, Goodman moved past motifs of "divided self" and towards making whole: "Relent, remedy". Goodman believed in paradise lost, that the power of healers (to remedy) comes from sacrificing their own health and happiness (to relent). For example, the sailors of "The Galley to Mytilene" revive the survivors, signifying how after relenting towards himself, Goodman is free to relent towards others (the survivors). The plot of "relent, remedy" recurs throughout much of the Goodman's remaining fiction ("The Death of Aesculapius", "Bathers at Westover Pond") up through his breakthrough work of social criticism, Growing Up Absurd (1960), which brought the theme into real life. Goodman said that the book was the action he had wanted for his fictional heroes, the culmination of his therapy, theorizing, alienation, and provocations. Throughout the 1960s, Goodman focused on social criticism and his therapeutic role in healing the alienated. He wrote no short stories after 1960.

== Style and themes ==
Goodman's fiction is in a solitary literary tradition. To his contemporaries, his unique style read as "experimental, abrasive, and capricious". Goodman eschewed connections to contemporaneous 1930s proletarian fiction, 1940s Freudian realism, and 1950s/1960s hermeticism. He considered his influences to be cubism, impressionism, the sonata form, atonality, and "naturalistic" anarchism.

The themes of Goodman's fiction often reflected the paradoxes of his social thought, with themes of how following one's nature leads to alienation.

In his two academic studies of literature, The Structure of Literature (1954) and Speaking and Language (1971), Goodman praises literature's ability to highlight themes from life without requiring full clarity of the truth.

== Reception ==
Goodman's fiction audience was small, as readers would struggle with his style. While he was rarely recognized for his fiction, Goodman's work received "respectful reviews and some vociferous admirers", according to Richard Kostelanetz. Goodman's fiction sold poorly and had a small audience through the 1950s beyond the small New York anarchist circle, readers of Dwight Macdonald's Politics, and in the case of his Communitas, departments of architecture. His Art and Social Nature was quickly remaindered. His short story collections (The Facts of Life and The Break-up of Our Camp), his novel The State of Nature, and his analytic book Kafka's Prayer each sold poorly. He published The Dead of Spring through subscription from his friends in 1949. By 1956, he had mostly given up creative writing and kept a journal instead.

== Fictional works ==
=== Long fiction ===
- The Empire City (1959)
  - The Grand Piano: Or, The Almanac of Alienation (1942)
  - The State of Nature (1946)
  - The Dead of Spring (1950)
  - The Holy Terror (1959)
- Parents' Day (1951)
- Making Do (1963)

=== Short fiction collections ===
- The Facts of Life (1945)
- The Break-up of Our Camp, and Other Stories (1949)
- Our Visit to Niagara (1960)
- Adam and His Works (1968)
- The Collected Stories and Sketches of Paul Goodman (1977–1980, four volumes)

== Bibliography ==
- Caserio, Robert L. (2000). "Goodman, Paul (1911–1972)". In Haggerty, George E. (ed.). Gay Histories and Cultures: An Encyclopedia. New York: Garland. p. 412. ISBN 978-0-8153-1880-4.
- Gunn, Drewey Wayne (2016). "Paul Goodman: Parents' Day, 1951; Making Do, 1963". Gay American Novels, 1870–1970: A Reader's Guide. McFarland. pp. 79–80. ISBN 978-1-4766-2522-5.
- Guy, David (January 1981). "Poet of the Ordinary". The Sun. ISSN 0744-9666.
- Feltenstein, Harry Jr (June 1950). "A Poetic Imagination". Commentary. p. 596. ISSN 0010-2601.
- Fried, Lewis (1990). "Paul Goodman: The City as Self". Makers of the City. Amherst: University of Massachusetts Press. pp. 159–206. ISBN 978-0-87023-693-8.
- Kostelanetz, Richard (1969). "Paul Goodman: Persistence and Prevalence". Master Minds: Portraits of Contemporary American Artists and Intellectuals. New York: Macmillan. pp. 270–288. OCLC 23458.
- Morton, Donald (1990). "The Cultural Politics of (Sexual) Knowledge: On the Margins with Goodman". Social Text (25/26): 227–241. doi:10.2307/466248. ISSN 0164-2472. JSTOR 466248.
- Rogoff, Leonard (1997). "Paul Goodman". In Shatzky, Joel; Taub, Michael (eds.). Contemporary Jewish-American Novelists: A Bio-critical Sourcebook. Westport, Connecticut: Greenwood. pp. 128–139. ISBN 978-0-313-29462-4. OCLC 35758115.
- Stoehr, Taylor (March 26, 1977). "Cunning, Fraud or Flight". The Nation. Vol. 224. pp. 373–376. EBSCOhost 11198430.
- — (1986). "Adam and Everyman: Paul Goodman in His Stories". Words and Deeds: Essays on the Realistic Imagination. New York: AMS Press. pp. 149–164. ISBN 978-0-404-61578-9. OCLC 11001514.
- — (1993). "Paul Goodman". In Meanor, Patrick (ed.). American Short-Story Writers Since World War II. Dictionary of Literary Biography. Vol. 130. Gale. pp. 188–199. ISBN 0-8103-5389-X.
- — (1994a). Here Now Next: Paul Goodman and the Origins of Gestalt Therapy. San Francisco: Jossey-Bass. ISBN 978-0-7879-0005-2. OCLC 30029013.
- — (October 1994b). "Graffiti and the Imagination: Paul Goodman in His Short Stories". Harvard Library Bulletin. 5 (3): 20–37. ISSN 0017-8136.
- Sulkes, Stan (2010). "Paul Goodman". Critical Survey of Long Fiction (4th ed.). Salem Press. pp. 1892–1900. ISBN 978-1-58765-535-7.
