= The Double E =

1977 book by Percival Goodman

- Author: Percival Goodman
- Subject: Planning
- Publisher: Anchor Books
- Publication date: 1977
- Pages: 304

The Double E is a 1977 book by Percival Goodman about utopian planning that accounts for economy and ecology in a time of scarcity.

== See also ==
- Communitas (book)
