= Percival Goodman =

American architect

- Born: January 13, 1904; New York City, New York, U.S.
- Died: October 11, 1989 (aged 85); New York City, New York, U.S.
- Occupation: Architect
- Practice: Percival Goodman
- Buildings: Multiple (see list)

Percival Goodman FAIA (January 13, 1904 – October 11, 1989) was an American urban theorist and architect who designed more than 50 synagogues between 1948 and 1983. He has been called the "leading theorist" of modern synagogue design, and "the most prolific architect in Jewish history."

== Biography ==
Percival Goodman was born in New York City to parents who were in the arts business. His father was a leading New York auctioneer who abandoned the family when Percival was young. His brother was the noted writer and sociologist Paul Goodman. At age 14, he became an apprentice for an architect. In 1925, Percival Goodman received the Society of Beaux-Arts Architects Paris Prize which sent him to the École des Beaux-Arts in Paris, France, for architectural training.

In the earlier part of his career, Goodman designed department store interiors, apartments, and country houses. He also had an interest in urban planning: he submitted a 1930 proposal for the Palace of the Soviets in Moscow, and proposed a master plan for Long Island City. He was an early critic of Robert Moses' parkway plans for New York City, preferring to "improve the center and make livable neighborhoods"; he also criticized the garden city movement of Ebenezer Howard and the Ville Radieuse of Le Corbusier.

Goodman called himself "an agnostic who was converted by Hitler", and after World War II he became more interested in Jewish architecture. At a 1947 conference of the Reform Jewish movement, the Union of American Hebrew Congregations, Goodman advocated the use of modern architecture for new Jewish buildings, rather than following the models of older churches and synagogues. He quickly began to receive commissions. Many of these were for new buildings in suburban areas reachable only by car, and Goodman responded by using a variety of designs intended to attract motorists' attention. In 1949 his proposal was selected for a large Holocaust memorial in Manhattan's Riverside Park, but it was never built. His student Peter Eisenman much later completed a Holocaust memorial in Berlin, the Memorial to the Murdered Jews of Europe.

His design for B'nai Israel in Millburn, New Jersey (1951), has been called "the first truly modern synagogue". Goodman's design for B'nai Israel included sculpture, painting, and ark curtain design by Herbert Ferber, Robert Motherwell, and Adolph Gottlieb, respectively. This integration of modern sculpture and artworks, along with the use of natural light, became hallmarks of Goodman's work. Goodman "stressed the human scale in his prayer halls and collaboration with modern artists where expressive symbolism was warranted", according to Philip Nobel at the New York Times.

Percival Goodman was also considered a distinguished urban theorist. He was the co-author, with his brother Paul, of the landmark urban planning text Communitas, and he illustrated editions of a number of his brother's other works. Percival Goodman was a fellow of the American Institute of Architects. He was a professor at the Columbia University architecture school for more than 25 years, where notable students included Peter Eisenman and Wang Chiu-Hwa. In 2001, Columbia exhibited a retrospective of his works at its Wallach Gallery.

== Selected buildings ==
- Florida Tropical House, Beverly Shores, Indiana (interiors, with James S. Kuhne) (1933)
- Congregation B'nai Israel, Millburn, New Jersey (1951)
- Temple Emanuel, Davenport, Iowa (1953)
- Congregation Beth Israel, Lebanon, Pennsylvania (1953)
- Temple Beth Sholom, Miami Beach, Florida (1954)
- Temple Israel, Tulsa, Oklahoma (1955)
- Temple of Aaron, St. Paul, Minnesota (1956)
- Congregation B'nai Israel, Bridgeport, Connecticut (1956)
- Congregation Beth Emeth, Albany, New York (1957)
- Congregation Shaaray Shalom, Franklin Square, New York-West Hempstead, New York (1958)
- Temple Adath Yeshurun, Manchester, New Hampshire (1959)
- Fifth Avenue Synagogue, New York, New York (1959)
- Tanger Hillel (formerly B'nai B'rith Hillel - Abe Stark House), Brooklyn, New York (1959)
- Shaarey Zedek, Southfield, Michigan (1962)
- Congregation Beth Shalom, Oak Park, Michigan (1957)
- Temple Beth El, Rochester, New York (1963)
- Temple Beth El, Springfield, Massachusetts
- Congregation Ohev Shalom, Wallingford, Pennsylvania (1965)

== Selected writings ==
- Communitas: Means of Livelihood and Ways of Life, with Paul Goodman (Chicago: University of Chicago Press, 1947); revised 2nd edition (New York: Vintage Books, 1960); revised 3rd edition (New York: Columbia University Press, 1990)
- “Banning Cars from Manhattan”, with Paul Goodman (essay in Dissent (Summer 1961))
- The Double E (Anchor Press, 1977)
- Illustrator for various books by Paul Goodman including: Parents' Day; Don Juan: Or, The Continuum of the Libido; and Stop-Light: Five Dance Poems.
