= Kingsway Jewish Center =

Orthodox synagogue in Brooklyn, New York

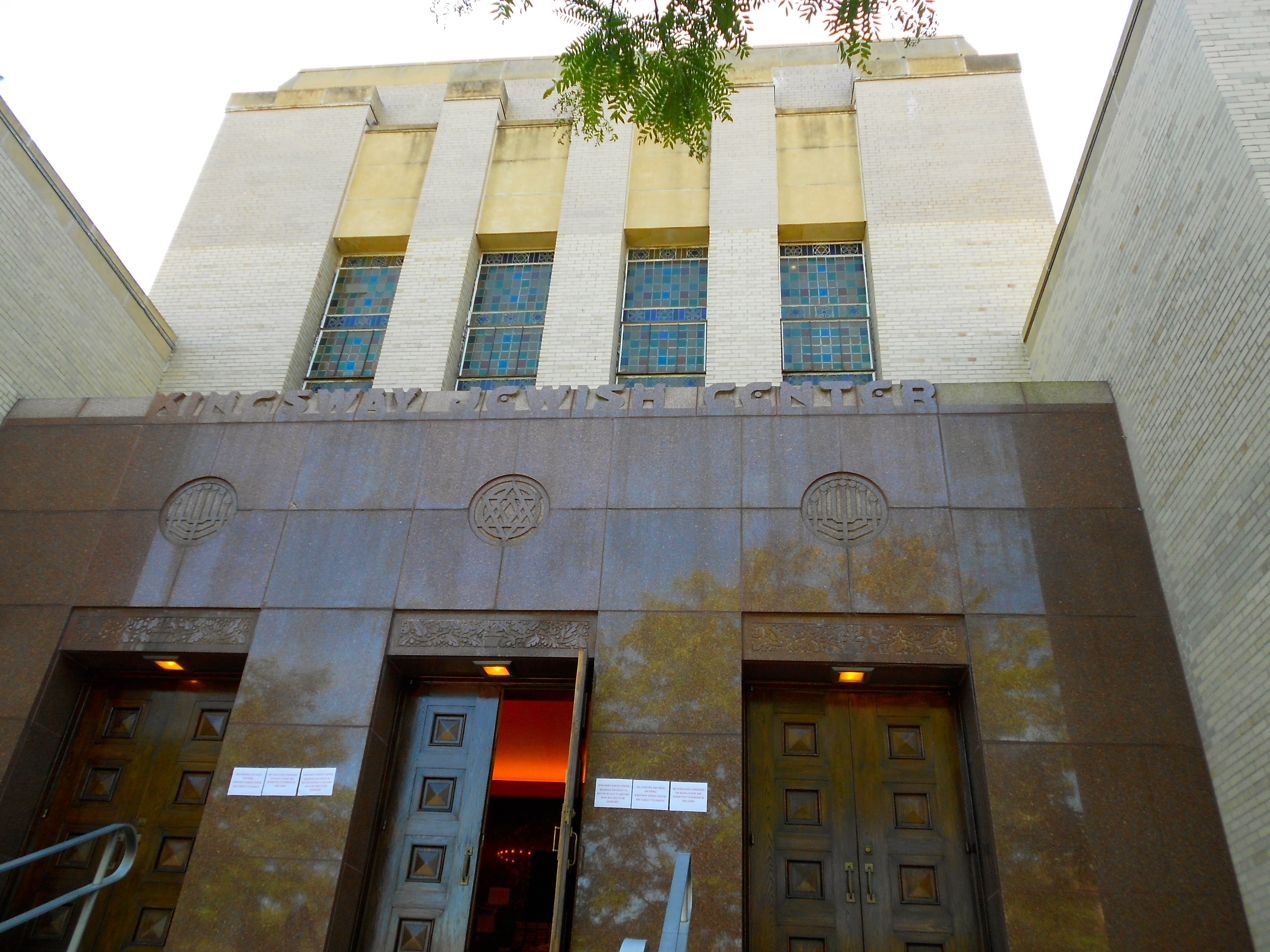
- The Center façade in 2013

- Location in New York City

Religion
- Affiliation: Modern Orthodox Judaism
- Ecclesiastical or organisational status: Synagogue
- Leadership: Rabbi Etan Tokayer; Rabbi Mordechai Schiffman (Assistant); Rabbi Shlomo Wolman (Shamash); Rabbi Milton H. Polin (Rabbi Emeritus)
- Status: Active
- Religious features: 18 stained glass windows by Adolph Gottlieb

Location
- Location: 2810 Nostrand Avenue, Midwood, Brooklyn, New York City, New York
- Country: United States
- Coordinates: 40°36′57″N 73°56′41″W

Architecture
- Architects: Martyn Weston; Herman Sohn; Adolph Gottlieb
- Type: Synagogue
- Style: Art Deco
- Established: 1928 (as a congregation)
- Completed: 1951
- Materials: Steel; brick

Website
- kingswayjewishcenter.org
- Kingsway Jewish Center
- U.S. National Register of Historic Places
- New York State Register of Historic Places
- Area: less than one acre
- NRHP reference No.: 10000010
- NYSRHP No.: 04701.015616

Significant dates
- Added to NRHP: February 12, 2010
- Designated NYSRHP: November 6, 2009

The Kingsway Jewish Center is an historic Modern Orthodox Jewish synagogue at 2810 Nostrand Avenue, in the Midwood neighborhood of Brooklyn in New York City, New York, United States.

== History ==
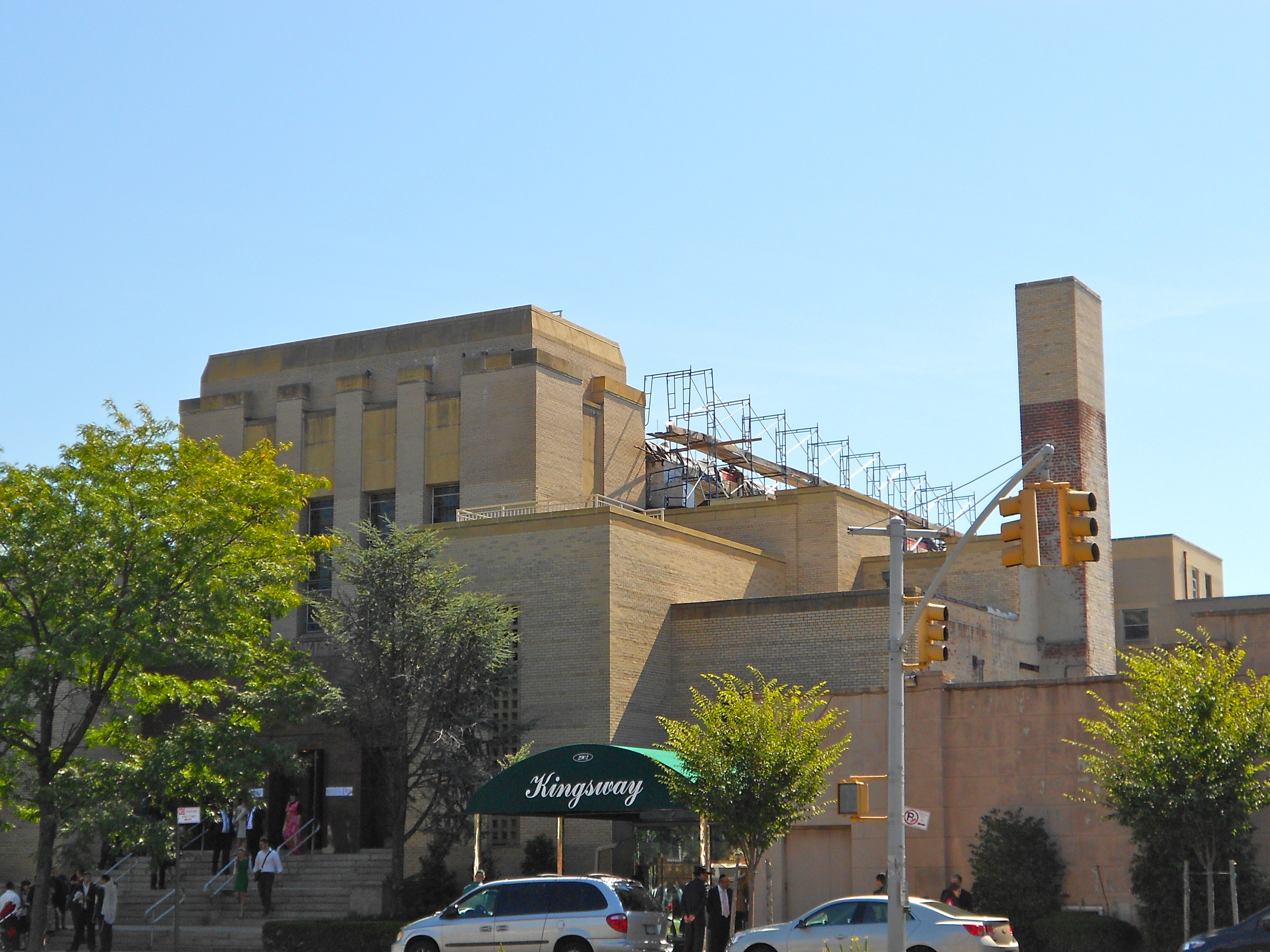
View of the synagogue from across Kings Highway

The Center complex includes the synagogue (1951), school block (1957), and catering hall wing (c. 1957). The synagogue features a series of 18 windows designed by abstract expressionist artist Adolph Gottlieb. It is a four-story steel frame building with a brick faced facade that steps back from the property line as it rises. The school building is a simple three story building with long rectangular windows and several entrances.

It was listed on the National Register of Historic Places in 2010.
