= Making Do =

1963 novel by Paul Goodman

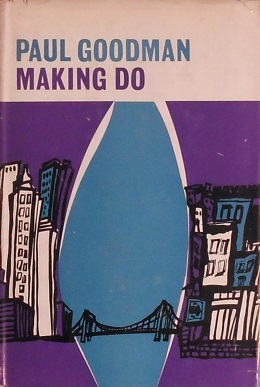
- First edition
- Author: Paul Goodman
- Published: November 1963
- Publisher: Macmillan
- Pages: 276
- OCLC: 284498
- LC Class: PS3513 O53 M3

Making Do is a 1963 roman à clef novel written by Paul Goodman and published by Macmillan.

== Synopsis ==
Most of the story is set in Vanderzee, New Jersey, a fictionalized Hoboken, where the main characters live after being priced out of and disenchanted with New York City. The novel vascillates between first- and third-person narration. The unnamed narrator meets a college student, Terry, at an Ohio State University panel discussion and falls in love. Their relationship is sexual but they're rarely presented together and some details are presented indirectly, such Terry's drug-induced schizophrenia. Another character, Harold, is impotent and longs for one woman but spends time with teenage Puerto Rican hustlers in New York's Union Square who spend his money. One is tricked into betraying Harold.

The novel is self-referential, as Terry is narrated to have learned about "community" from "Goodman, the anarchist writer, whom he had newly added to the pantheon alongside Nathanael West and Mailer" and another character criticizes Goodman.

The "Banning the Cars from New York" chapter begins with a spontaneous youth handball game played on the wall of a store. When its owner calls the police to end the game, the boy chastizes the narrator for not intervening, for "betraying natural society". The narrator emotionally navigates the conversation and later that evening speaks on a metropolitan radio broadcast about social issues and transportation, proposing how private automobiles could be banned and the streets could be reclaimed for leisure.

== Publication ==
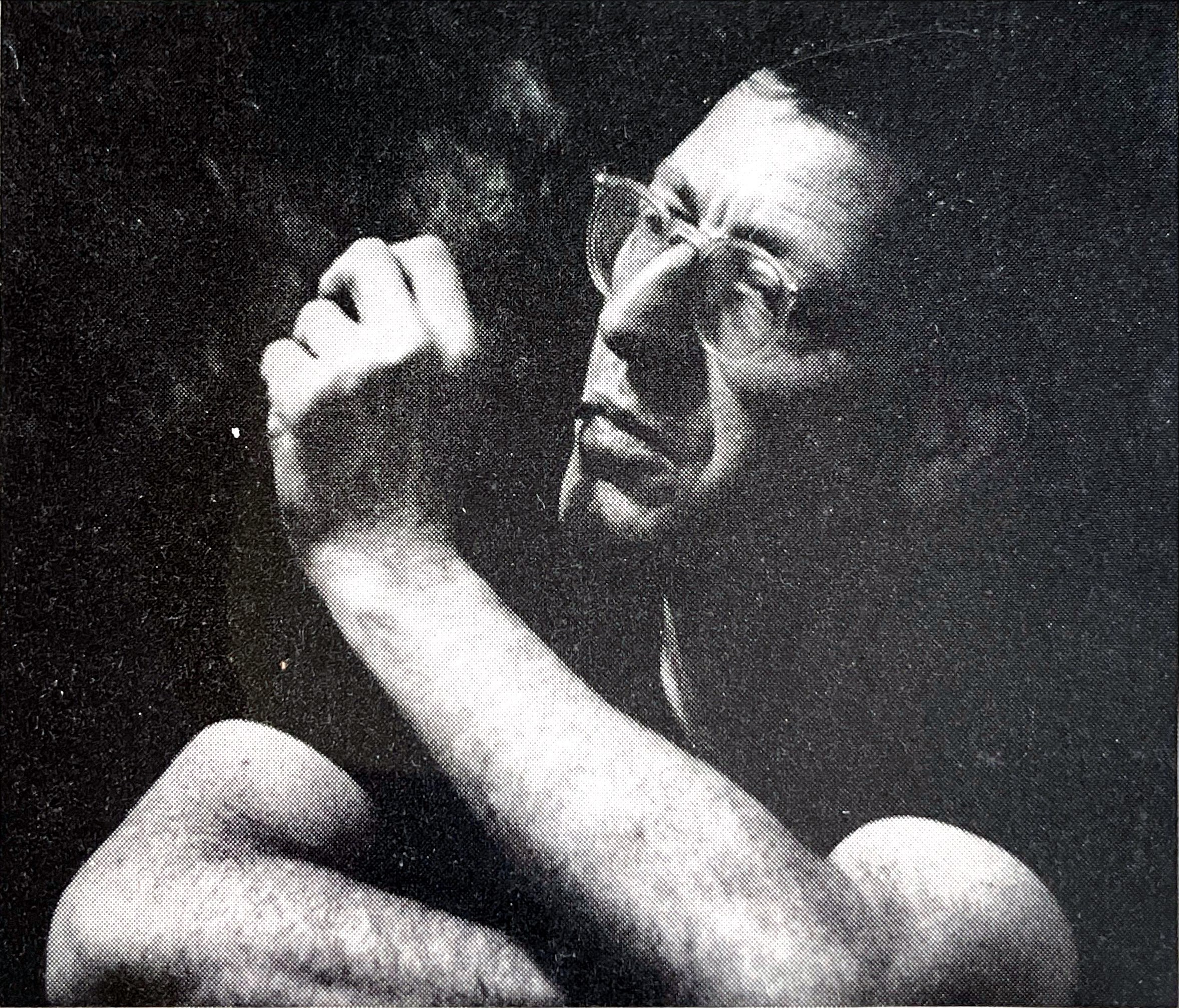
The author, c. 1964

The Macmillan Company first printed Making Do in November 1963. A paperback edition followed in October 1964 with New American Library's Signet imprint. The book incorporated previous works by Goodman, such as his 1961 proposal for banning cars from Manhattan and two short stories: "Eagle's Bridge: The Death of a Dog" (1962) and "At the Lawyer's" (1963).

Goodman referred to Making Do, along with Parents' Day and The Break-Up of Our Camp as his three "community novels". The work is a roman à clef: autobiographical fiction with its central character as a middle-aged social critic, i.e., Goodman.

Goodman's novels and poetry often featured gay subject matter.

== Analysis and legacy ==
Theodore Roszak wrote that the "Banning the Cars from New York" chapter encapsulated Goodman's ethos in building from spontaneous human joy into addressing a structural civic issue. It begins with Goodman's emphasis on unperturbed animal impulse, such as child's play or the narrator's physical love for the boy, and extrapolates into a larger societal concern and analysis.

Goodman's fictional works received little critical recognition, according to a bibliographer of his works.

The New York Times described Making Do as "a poor novel and a very interesting book" and that despite the narrator's similarity with the author, the narrator becomes a "bore".

== Bibliography ==
- Finn, James (December 15, 1963). "A Utopian Narrator Gets Out of Hand (Rev. of Making Do)". The New York Times Book Review. p. 22.
- Fried, Lewis (1990). "Paul Goodman: The City as Self". Makers of the City. Amherst: University of Massachusetts Press. pp. 159–206. ISBN 978-0-87023-693-8.
- Gunn, Drewey Wayne (2016). "Paul Goodman: Parents' Day, 1951; Making Do, 1963". Gay American Novels, 1870–1970: A Reader's Guide. McFarland. pp. 79–80. ISBN 978-1-4766-2522-5.
- Malcolm, Donald (November 28, 1964). "Books: Five-Thumb Exercise". The New Yorker. Vol. 40. pp. 238, 241, 244–245. ISSN 0028-792X. EBSCOhost 23160032.
- Mudrick, Marvin (Spring 1964). "Man Alive". The Hudson Review. 17 (1): 110–123. doi:10.2307/3848254. ISSN 0018-702X. JSTOR 3848254.
- Nicely, Tom (1979). "Making Do". Adam and His Work: A Bibliography of Sources by and about Paul Goodman (1911–1972). Scarecrow Press. p. 91. ISBN 978-0-8108-1219-2.
- Pickrel, Paul (November 1963). "Rev. of Making Do". Harper's Magazine. Vol. 227. p. 128. ISSN 0017-789X.
- Poirier, Richard (December 15, 1963). "Cutting a Figure in Sack Cloth (Rev. of Making Do)". Book Week. p. 6. ISSN 0524-059X. OCLC 01536776.
- Rexroth, Kenneth (February 16, 1964). "Our Anti-Life Bohemians". Book Week. San Francisco, California. pp. 2, 19.
- Roszak, Theodore (April 15, 1968). "The Future as Community". Nation. 206 (16): 497–503. ISSN 0027-8378.
- — (1969). "Exploring Utopia: The Visionary Sociology of Paul Goodman". The Making of a Counter Culture: Reflections on the Technocratic Society and Its Youthful Opposition. Garden City, New York: Doubleday. pp. 178–204. OCLC 23039.
- Schott, Webster (January 14, 1964). "Literature Enters New Phase with Liberty of Expression". The Kansas City Times. Kansas City, Missouri. p. 26.
- Stoehr, Taylor (1994). Here Now Next: Paul Goodman and the Origins of Gestalt Therapy. Jossey-Bass. ISBN 978-0-7879-0005-2.
- Sulkes, Stan (2010). "Paul Goodman". Critical Survey of Long Fiction (4th ed.). Salem Press. pp. 1892–1900. ISBN 978-1-58765-535-7.
