= Herbert Ferber =

American painter and sculptor (1906–1991)

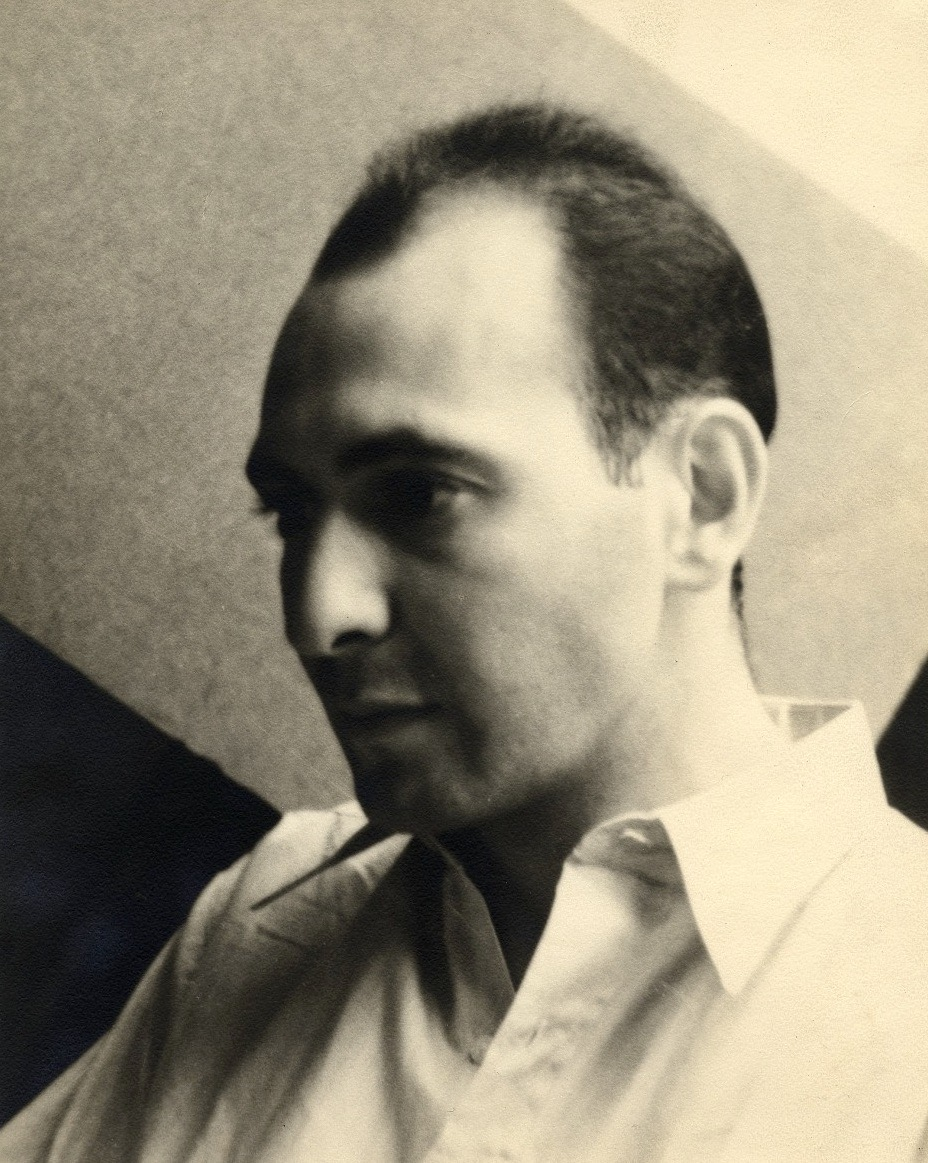
- Born: Herbert Ferber Silvers; April 30, 1906; New York City, U.S.
- Died: August 20, 1991 (aged 85); North Egremont, Massachusetts, U.S.
- Education: CCNY; Columbia University; Beaux-Arts Institute of Design
- Known for: Abstract expressionist sculptor and painter
- Notable work: "Sculpture as Environment"
- Movement: Abstract Expressionism, Surrealism
- Spouse(s): Edith Popiel (third wife, executor)
- Awards: Guggenheim Fellowship
- Patrons: Whitney Museum of American Art, Congregation B'nai Israel
- Website: herbertferberestate.org

Herbert Ferber, Homage to Piranesi V, copper, 1965-6, National Gallery of Art (Washington, D. C.)

Herbert Ferber (April 30, 1906 – August 20, 1991) was an American painter and sculptor. He is an abstract expressionist and is considered a vital member of the New York School."

== Background ==
Herbert Ferber Silvers was born on April 30, 1906, in New York City. In 1923, he began studies in both sciences and humanities at the College of the City of New York (now City College of New York or CCNY) from; in 1927, he received a BS from jointly from CCNY and Columbia University. In 1927, he took night classes in sculpture through 1930 at the Beaux-Arts Institute of Design ("affiliated in a kind of loose way with the Beaux Arts in Paris," Ferber later recalled) and then studied for six months at the National Academy of Design. That summer, he was awarded a scholarship to work at The Louis Comfort Tiffany Foundation in Oyster Bay, New York. In 1930, he graduated in oral and dental surgery at Columbia.

== Career ==
Ferber practiced dentistry and taught part-time at the Columbia Dental School during the 1930s; he continued to sculpt and practice dentistry up through the 1950s. William Zorach and Julio Gonzales influenced Ferber (and Picasso, but Ferber himself also credited painter David McCosh:

David McCosh... who had studied at the Art Institute of Chicago, and whom I had met at the Tiffany Foundation at Oyster Bay... began to increase my knowledge of what art was about because here was a man who had really studied in a good art school and who had been in Europe for a year and was a follower of Cézanne. And he opened my eyes to a great many possibilities in painting and sculpture which I wasn't even aware of... Through McCosh I met some other artists... And we met some other artists who were studying at the League and also... Theodore Roszak.

In 1931, Ferber sculpted in wood and stone. In 1935, he joined New York's Midtown Galleries. In 1936, he joined the Artists Union and took part in the first American Artists' Congress. During the 1930s, his works were "primarily figurative and imagistic," influenced in part by an interest in German expressionists as well as African and pre-Columbian sculpture. By the mid-1930s, Ferber found himself " very much disenchanted with the whole Communist movement." In 1938, he traveled to Europe and saw Romanesque sculpture. In 1940, he joined fellow anti-Stalinist artists (Ilya Bolotowsky, Adolph Gottlieb, Mark Rothko, Meyer Schapiro, David Smith, Bradley Walker Tomlin) in forming the Federation of Modern Painters and Sculptors as a spin-off of the Communist-aligned American Artists' Congress.

In 1940, Ferber changed his approach to sculpture from carving to gluing and doweling; he last worked in wood in 1944. Ferber came under the influence of Henry Moore. In 1945, Ferber began experimenting in steel-reinforced concrete, abstract sculpture, and metal-soldering. Starting in 1946, he associated with Abstract Expressionist painters, frequented Peggy Guggenheim's Art of This Century, and became more interested in Surrealism.

In the 1950s, Ferber began creating "roofed" and "caged" sculpture. In 1952, Ferber completed a commission for the facade of the Congregation B'nai Israel; the result was the relief sculpture "Titled And the bush was not consumed." In 1956, Ferber joined artists who protested a curvilinear slope of Frank Lloyd Wright's planned building for the Guggenheim Museum. Throughout the 1950s, Ferber lectured on and exhibited metal sculpture and site-specific sculpture.

In 1961, for the Whitney Museum of American Art, he created one of the first indoor environmental installations, "Titled Sculpture as Environment," a fiberglass piece for an entire room with interior spaces to visit. His work as a teacher included visiting professorships at the University of Pennsylvania, Philadelphia (1962–63), and Rutgers University, New Jersey (1965–67).

In the 1970s and 1980s, Ferber worked on large, abstract forms and also returned to painting as well as painted sculpture.

In 1971, as guardian of Mark Rothko's daughter Kate, Ferber charged executors of the Mark Rothko estate of conspiring with the Marlborough Gallery to waste the estate's assets. An eight-month trial ended in October 1974, eventually leading to dismissal of executors and gallery, heavy fines, and appointment of Kate Rothko as executor. Remaining paintings went to her and brother Christopher Rothko; a foundation gave its share of the works to museums.

== Personal life and death ==
Ferber married Sonia Stirt in 1932, Ilse Falk in 1944, and Edith Popiel in 1967, a photographer.

In 1968, Ferber stated:

I became an artist because I was interested in literature particularly and not primarily in painting and sculpture. But then, while at college, along with my interest in literature I developed an interest in the history of art... I never got beyond the Metropolitan and the Museum of Natural History... [It was at] the "Tiffany Foundation where I met for the first time some other artists.

Herbert Ferber died on August 20, 1991, of cholangiocarcinoma at his summer home in Egremont, Massachusetts.

== Awards ==
According to the Herbert Ferber Estate, awards to Ferber have included:

- 1942: Fifth Purchase Prize, Artists for Victory exhibition, Metropolitan Museum of Art
- 1943: Full member, Kappa Chapter (Columbia University), Society of Sigma Psi
- 1953: Joint American prize winner, International Sculpture Competition, The Unknown Political Prisoner Monument, Institute of Contemporary Art, London
- 1969: Guggenheim Fellowship
- 1979: R. S. Reynolds Memorial Award for aluminum sculpture

== Commissions ==
Ferber received numerous commissions for synagogues, e.g., a candelabrum and altar decoration for the chapel of Brandeis University. Other commissions include: a copper sculpture for the John F. Kennedy Office Building in Boston, an environmental sculpture for Rutgers University, and a steel sculpture for the American Dental Association Building in Chicago.

According to the Herbert Ferber Estate, commissions to Ferber have included:

- 1951: B'nai Israel Synagogue, Millburn, New Jersey.
- 1954: Berlin Chapel, Brandeis University, Waltham, Massachusetts
- 1956: Temple Aaron, St. Paul, Minnesota
- 1957: Temple Anshe Chesed, Cleveland, Ohio
- 1961: Whitney Museum of American Art, New York, New York
- 1965: Commons Building, Rutgers University, New Brunswick, New Jersey
- 1977-78: City of Ottumwa, Iowa

== Legacy ==
In 1978, Ferber appeared in Masters of Modern Sculpture, Part Three, by Michael Blackwood.

At his death in 1991, the New York Times said:

Mr. Ferber was one of a small group of American sculptors who in the 1940s began to break with the traditional notion of sculpture as a solid, closed mass. He made open, airy forms that, as he put it, "pierced" space rather than displaced it, and he is credited with creating, in 1960, one of the first environmental sculptures intended for people to walk through... Mr. Ferber was also an accomplished painter, his canvases taking the form of sculpturelike reliefs on which he painted abstract motifs."

In 2019, the Wall Street Journal noted:

In 1949, Clement Greenberg counted Ferber, along with Isamu Noguchi and (David) Smith, among a handful of "sculptor-constructors who have a chance... to contribute something ambitious, serious and original" to what he recognized as an important "new genre" of American metal sculpture.

Ferber and his wife appear in accounts of New York circles, including Writings on Art by Mark Rothko (2006) and The World in My Kitchen (2006), written by Colette Rossant, whose husband was architect and painter James Rossant. According to the Oxford Reference Dictionary:

Among the earliest artists to produce an abstract expressionist form of sculpture, from the late 1940s he drew on constructivist and surrealist precedents to achieve vigorous, almost gestural welded abstractions. In time, his work evolved toward environmental sculpture, culminating during the 1960s in room-size installations of abstract form... An observer venturing into such a room in effect entered the sculpture.

== Works ==
Herbert Ferber, Untitled, lithograph 1959, Smithsonian American Art Museum

Ferber's best-known sculptures are open, hollow forms in soldered and welded metal. While abstract, their titles and spiky forms often suggest forces in conflict. ('Labors of Hercules' is an example). By the mid-1950s, he began to create, what he called, roofed sculptures―some parts of which hung from the ceiling while other parts rose from the floor. These were followed by so-called cage works―large, boxy forms within which other forms were set. With, Ferber created an installation executed in fiberglass for a room at the Whitney Museum of American Art in New York City, opening up the interior space of the work for the viewer to enter. In the 1970s, Ferber continued his exploration of abstract form, mostly in large-scale outdoor pieces.

Ferber's works have appeared the Metropolitan, the Modern, and Whitney museums in New York and in Europe. His longest-term art dealer was M. Knoedler & Co., who exhibited Ferber's last living show in September 1990.

Solo exhibitions: According to the Herbert Ferber Estate, solo exhibitions have included:

- André Emmerich Gallery (1960, 1963-1977)
- Betty Parsons Gallery (1947, 1950, 1953)
- Columbia University School of Architecture (1960)
- Dag Hammarskjold Plaza Sculpture Garden (1972)
- Knoedler & Company (1978-1982, 1984-1987, 1989, 1993, 1995, 1998, 2001)
- Lowe Art Museum (2009-2010)
- M. Knoedler, Zurich (1984)
- Midtown Gallery (1937, 1943)
- Lorenzelli Arte, Milan (1988)
- Philadelphia Museum of Art (2019–20)
- Samuel Kootz Gallery (1955, 1957)
- Tanglewood (1978)
- Walker Art Center (1962)
- Whitney Museum of American Art (1961, 1963)

Group exhibitions: According to the Herbert Ferber Estate, group exhibitions have included:

- American Artists’ Congress (1936)
- André Emmerich Gallery (1976)
- Art Institute of Chicago (~1941-2, 1954)
- Betty Parsons Gallery (1947)
- Brooklyn Museum (1931, 2001)
- Buchholz Gallery (1940, 1943, 1945)
- Detroit Institute of Arts (1958, 1973)
- Jewish Museum of New York (2004, 2008, 2010)
- John Reed Club Gallery (1933)
- Los Angeles County Museum of Art (1968)
- Metropolitan Museum of Art (1942, 1951, 1952)
- Midtown Galleries (1931, 1935-1936)
- Musée du Jeu de Paume (1938)
- Musée National d'Art Moderne (1954)
- Musée Rodin (1965)
- Museum of Modern Art (MoMA) (1953, 1968, 1969)
- Pennsylvania Academy of The Fine Arts (1931, 1942, 1943, 1945-1946, 1954, 1958)
- Philadelphia Museum of Art (1940, 1972)
- Phillips Collection (1971)
- Rhode Island School of Design Museum of Art (1950)
- Smithsonian Institution (1975)
- Tate Gallery (1953)
- Walker Art Center (2002)
- Whitney Museum of American Art (1938, 1940, 1942, 1945-1946, 1948, 1950, 1954-1960, 1963, 1966, 1968, 1976, 1981, 1983-1984, 1988, 1999, 2000)

Ferber's work also appeared at group exhibitions at the San Francisco Golden Gate International Exposition (1939), New York World's Fair (1940, 1964), the U.S. Pavilion at the World Fair in Brussels (1958), and the Seattle World's Fair (1962).

Permanent collections: Public collections holding works by Herbert Ferber include:

- Albright-Knox Art Gallery (Buffalo, New York)
- Cantor Arts Center (Stanford University, Palo Alto, California)
- Dallas Museum of Art (Dallas, Texas)
- Honolulu Museum of Art
- National Gallery of Art (Washington, D. C.)
- Neuberger Museum of Art (Purchase College, Purchase, New York)
- Newark Museum (Newark, New Jersey)
- Pennsylvania Academy of the Fine Arts
- Saint Louis Art Museum (St. Louis, Missouri)
- Whitney Museum of American Art (New York City)
- Yale University Art Gallery (New Haven, Connecticut)
- Governor Nelson A. Rockefeller Empire State Plaza Art Collection (Albany, New York)
- The Jewish Museum (New York)

Works online:

- 1930:
  - "Turrets"
  - "Medical Center"
  - "Untitled (Standing Woman)"
- 1931: "Untitled (Woodstock Landscape)"
- 1950:
  - "Game No. 2"
  - "The Bow"
- 1955-6: "Homage to Piranesi V"
- 1957: "Calligraph with Wall"
- 1960-1988: Sculptures, paintings of the Herbert Ferber Estate
- 1962-3:
  - "Homage to Piranesi II"
  - "Calligraph in Cage with Cluster No. 2, II (with two heads)"
- 1960-1967: Sculptures, paintings at Valerie Carberry Gallery
- 1972: "Konkapot II"
- (Undated): Wall Sculpture #5"
- (Undated): United States Department of State: Sculptures, paintings of Herbert Ferber

Books on Ferber:

- Agee, William C., Herbert Ferber: Sculpture, Painting, Drawing, 1945-1980 (Houston: Museum of Fine Arts, 1983)
- Andersen, Wayne V., The Sculpture of Herbert Ferber (Minneapolis: Walker Art Center, 1962)
- Balken, Debra Bricker, Herbert Ferber, Sculpture & Drawings, 1932-1983 (Pittsfield, Mass.: Berkshire Museum, 1984)
- Dreishpoon, Douglas, Between Transcendence and Brutality: American Sculptural Drawings from the 1940s and 1950s: Louise Bourgeois, Dorothy Dehner, Herbert Ferber, Seymour Lipton, Isamu Noguchi, Theodore Roszak, David Smith (Tampa: Tampa Museum of Art, 1994)
- Goossen, E. C., Herbert Ferber (New York: Abbeville Press, 1981)
- Marika Herskovic, American Abstract Expressionism of the 1950s An Illustrated Survey, (New York: New York School Press, 2003) ISBN 0-9677994-1-4. pp. 118–121
- Marika Herskovic, New York School Abstract Expressionists Artists Choice by Artists, (New York: New York School Press, 2000) ISBN 0-9677994-0-6. p. 18; p. 36; pp. 130–133
- Verderame, Lori, The Founder of Sculpture as Environment, Herbert Ferber (1906–1991) (Hamilton, New York: Picker Art Gallery at Colgate University, 1998)

== See also ==
- Abstract expressionism
- New York School (art)
- Mark Rothko
