= Temple Beth Sholom (Miami Beach, Florida) =

Reform Jewish synagogue in Miami, Florida, US

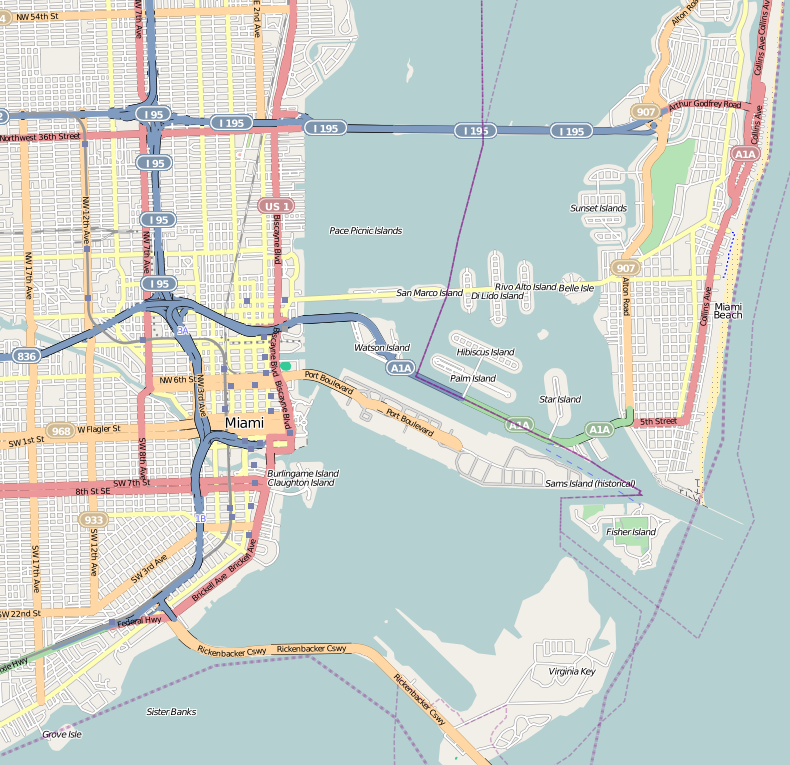
- Location in Miami Beach

Religion
- Affiliation: Reform Judaism
- Ecclesiastical or organisational status: Synagogue
- Leadership: Senior Rabbi Gayle Pomerantz; Rabbi Robert A. Davis; Rabbi Joanne Loibe
- Status: Active

Location
- Location: 4144 Chase Avenue, Miami Beach, Florida, US
- Municipality: Miami
- State: Florida
- Country: United States
- Coordinates: 25°48′53″N 80°07′55″W

Architecture
- Architect: Percival Goodman (1956)
- Type: Synagogue
- Style: Modernist
- Founder: Abraham Zinnamon and Benjamin Appel
- Established: 1942
- Capacity: 700 worshipers

Website
- tbsmb.org

Temple Beth Sholom (a transliteration of the Hebrew words for "House of Peace") is a Reform Jewish congregation and synagogue located at 4144 Chase Avenue in Miami Beach, Florida.

The congregation was established in 1942 and has 1,210 member households. Temple Beth Sholom is a member of the Union for Reform Judaism.

== Early history ==
Abraham Zinnamon and Benjamin Appel established the Beth Sholom Jewish Center. After seeing a Yiddish newspaper in Appel's hands, Zinnamon approached him with the idea of forming a Jewish Center. The first founders' meeting of Beth Sholom Center took place on April 6, 1942. On June 3, 1942, they leased a building at 761 41st Street for the new Center.

A charter of the State of Florida was granted shortly thereafter. Rabbi Samuel Machtai, the "Radio Rabbi," conducted the first High Holy Days Services in 1942. The service was held in a storefront, where 20 Miami Beach Jewish families gathered to provide a house of worship for themselves and for the Jewish servicemen that had served during WWII.

The Beth Sholom Jewish Center hired Rabbi Leon Kronish as a full-time rabbi on August 9, 1944, at the 36th meeting of the board of directors, held in the home of its chairman, Charles Tobin. Rabbi Leon Kronish was installed in the North Beach Elementary School auditorium by Rabbi Stephen Samuel Wise, president of the Jewish Institute of Religion.

== Chase Avenue expansions ==
The Temple Beth Sholom congregation moved in 1953 to a two-story house, the Chase Avenue Hotel, at 4141 Chase Avenue. It was re-modeled into a place of worship, with a capacity of 700. The membership grew from 40 households to more than 750 by 1955. By the late 1960s, the membership included more than 1200 families.

In 1956, the temple sanctuary and banquet hall were designed in the Modernist style by Jewish American architect Percival Goodman, comprising a series of parabolic arched domes and modeled on the work of Erich Mendelsohn. In 1961, architects added the religious school and auditorium.

In 1967, Temple Beth Sholom began its development as a cultural center for the Greater Miami Area, keeping with Kronish's vision of the Temple as a place for community as well as worship. In 1969, Rabbi Harry Jolt, zecher tzadik livracha, who had recently retired from his pulpit in Ventnor, New Jersey, was asked by Rabbi Kronish to become Auxiliary Rabbi and to assist in the cultural and adult education programs of the Temple.

In 1984, the school was refurbished, and the administrative wing was completed. In 2003, the school building was refurbished once again. A new two-story facility was created that included a youth center, offices, a chapel, a welcome center, classrooms, meeting spaces, and an art gallery. The temple is also surrounded by outdoor spaces, including play areas, a meditation garden, and a palm plaza. The Temple Beth Sholom campus is located at the corner of Chase Avenue and Arthur Godfrey Road in Miami Beach.

=== Kronish legacy ===
Kronish was active in Jewish organizational life, including involvement with the Jewish Federation, Histadrut, American Jewish Congress, and the Israel Bonds National Leadership. A first-generation American Jew whose family emigrated from Poland, he initiated a Confirmation Class trip to Israel that became a recurring program at the congregation.

== Senior rabbinate ==
In 1985, the temple engaged Gary Glickstein, who had served as Rabbi of Temple Sinai in Worcester, Massachusetts since 1977, to serve as the Senior Rabbi. Glickstein held leadership roles in several Jewish organizations, including serving as Chairman of the UJA National Rabbinic Cabinet, past Chair of the National Rabbinic Cabinet of Israel Bonds, past Treasurer of the Central Conference of American Rabbis, and past president of the Rabbinic Association of Greater Miami.

== See also ==
- History of the Jews in South Florida
- List of the oldest synagogues in the United States
