= Congregation B'nai Israel (Millburn, New Jersey) =

Conservative Jewish synagogue in New Jersey, US

- Location in Essex County, New Jersey

Religion
- Affiliation: Conservative Judaism
- Ecclesiastical or organisational status: Synagogue
- Leadership: Rabbi Ari Isenberg; Rabbi Steven Bayar (Emeritus)
- Status: Active

Location
- Location: Millburn, Essex County, New Jersey
- Country: United States
- Coordinates: 40°43′17″N 74°17′33″W

Architecture
- Architect: Percival Goodman
- Type: Synagogue
- Style: Modernist
- Established: 1924 (as a congregation)
- Completed: 1951

Website
- cbi-nj.org

B'nai Israel is an architecturally notable Conservative Jewish congregation and synagogue in Millburn, Essex County, New Jersey, in the United States. The current congregation was formed in 1924

The current building, designed by Percival Goodman in the Modernist style in 1951 has been lauded as "the first truly modern synagogue", and "a revolutionary moment in American synagogue design."

== History ==
Founded in 1924, the congregation hired Max Gruenewald as rabbi in 1946. He had been the rabbi of the Haupt Synagogue in Mannheim, Germany when it was destroyed during the Kristallnacht pogrom of 1938. In 1950, two stones from the Haupt Synagogue were retrieved and placed in the walls of the sanctuary. Rabbi Gruenewald served the congregation until his 1970 retirement, and also ran the Leo Baeck Institutes in New York, London, and Jerusalem.

As of August 2020, the rabbi is Ari Isenberg and the cantor is Lorna Wallach. Steven Bayar is Rabbi Emeritus.

== Synagogue building ==
Percival Goodman's design for B'nai Israel, constructed in 1951, has been called "the first truly modern synagogue", and "a revolutionary moment in American synagogue design." Goodman became known for his integration of modern sculpture and art into modernist buildings.

Adolph Gottlieb designed the curtain for the Torah Ark, Robert Motherwell designed a mural, and Herbert Ferber created an exterior sculpture for the new building. Goodman's use of cutting-edge artists caused a sensation in the American Jewish community, causing other congregations to rush to commission modernist buildings with works of art by contemporary artists. Motherwell's preparatory study for his mural is in the collection of The Jewish Museum in New York. The Gottlieb-designed curtain for the Torah Ark was stitched by the women of the congregation. Gottlieb's wife supervised the sewing of the curtain, which was made of velvet in two-tiers, with appliqués and metallic thread embroidery. By 1987, the curtain required extensive (and expensive) restoration, and the congregation decided to donate it to the Jewish Museum, which carried out the restoration and displays the curtain in special exhibitions.

In 2009, historic preservationists objected to renovation plans thought likely to negatively impact the building's architectural integrity. The Motherwell and Ferber artworks were taken down for the renovation, and loaned to The Jewish Museum in New York for an exhibition reuniting them with the original Gottlieb curtain.
