= Growing Up Absurd =

1960 book by Paul Goodman

- First paperback edition
- Author: Paul Goodman
- Language: English
- Subject: Social criticism, sociology, American youth
- Publisher: Random House
- Publication date: 1960
- Publication place: United States
- Media type: Print
- Pages: 296
- ISBN: 0-3947-0032-5
- LC Class: HQ796 G66

Growing Up Absurd is a 1960 book by Paul Goodman on the relationship between American juvenile delinquency and societal opportunities to fulfill natural needs. Contrary to the then-popular view that juvenile delinquents should be led to respect societal norms, Goodman argued that young American men were justified in their disaffection because their society lacked the preconditions for growing up, such as consideration and self-respect, meaningful work, honorable community, sexual freedom, and spiritual sustenance.

Goodman's book drew from his prior works, psychotherapy practice, and personal experiences and relations in New York City. The small New York press that originally commissioned the book asked Goodman to return his advance when the resulting book, written in late 1959, focused less on the commissioned subject of city youth gangs than on the American culture and value systems in which the youth were raised. Nineteen publishers rejected Growing Up Absurd before Norman Podhoretz used selections from the book to relaunch his magazine, Commentary. After Podhoretz encouraged Random House publisher Jason Epstein to reconsider the book, Goodman had a contract the next day. Random House published Growing Up Absurd in 1960 and a Vintage Books paperback edition followed two years later.

Growing Up Absurd quickly became a bestseller with 100,000 copies sold in its first three years and translations into five languages. It was widely read across 1960s college campuses and popular among student activists and the New Left, who assimilated the author's ideology. Growing Up Absurd transformed Goodman's outcast career into mainstream notoriety as a social critic, including invitations to lecture at hundreds of colleges, though Goodman's fame did not endure long after his death in 1972. Many specifics of Growing Up Absurd became dated with time and, in later years, retrospective reviewers criticized Goodman's exclusion of women from his analysis. New York Review Books reissued Growing Up Absurd in 2012.

== Background ==
In the United States, the affluent postwar 1950s was a time of both general prosperity and conformity. The latter had become a theme of social criticism by the decade's end. Critiques on the relation between social norms and the individual psyche included David Riesman's The Lonely Crowd (1950), William H. Whyte's The Organization Man (1956), and Vance Packard's The Status Seekers (1959). As a whole, this literature portrayed American culture as white-collar subservience to mass advertising and corporate life. Paul Goodman's Growing Up Absurd (1960) belongs to this tradition, having consolidated, as historian Kevin Mattson put it, "a decade's worth of social criticism".

Among American writers of the period, concern for proper childrearing and education loomed larger than questions of workplace conformity and middle-class standards. They largely wrote in disapproval of what youth culture portended for the country's future. The image of the juvenile delinquent became a pervasive symbol for this decline, reflected in the rise of urban youth gang warfare and the popular portrayal of the maladjusted, non-conformist outsider in films and theater such as The Wild One (1953), Rebel Without a Cause (1955), East of Eden (1955), and West Side Story (1957).

== Synopsis ==
In Growing Up Absurd: Problems of Youth in the Organized System, Paul Goodman faults American culture and values for the rise of juvenile delinquency in the late 1950s. Delinquency and "dropping out" of society, Goodman argues, are sane and justified responses to an adult society not worth growing up into, lacking in meaningful vocation, honorable community, sexual freedom, spiritual sustenance, and other qualities that youth require in their society to develop their social and moral identities, i.e. to grow up. He writes primarily about disaffected young men—urban juvenile delinquents and the beatnik subculture—and refers to the prevalent sterile, conformist American social order as the "organized system". (Note: The term "organized system" descended in the mid-1950s from American radicals who had previously predicted a permanent war economy and cold war following World War II.) Goodman disagrees with the then-common view that the solution for youth disaffection was to bring the youth to respect societal norms. Siding with the youth, he argues that the young already understood and rejected societal standards as unimportant. In this way, Goodman makes the youth social problem into less a problem than a symptom of a more existential need.

Goodman contends that American society ruined the concept of vocation and created artificial demands through advertising. Affluent, postwar advanced capitalism boasted high employment but, Goodman writes, at the cost of reliance on "artificial ... demand for useless goods" that created unfulfilling, bureaucratic work, without a sense of purpose or service. Goodman believes that vocation that focuses on use, interest, style, and love has meaning and self-justified purpose, but that work focused on role, procedure, and profit tends towards meaninglessness. Thus youth were rightfully disaffected, says Goodman, at the prospect of joining an adult society lacking fulfillment. The chapters of Growing Up Absurd apply this argument to facets of life including "Faith", "Jobs", "Patriotism", and sexuality ("Social Animal").

Goodman describes the period's mechanical social order and its feeling of inescapability and forced conformity as an "apparently closed room" fixated on a "rat race". He posits that citizens traded the simple pleasures of daily life for the securities of living under an affluent, mechanized order enabled by corporations, a situation he calls "sociolatry". To Goodman, this trade-off—that a society would choose the preservation of its systems over the sake of its own people—is "absurd".

Goodman holds that "socializing" youth to play specialized roles in an adult society is inherently wrong for betraying their nature in the name of societal benefit. Goodman asks, "Socialization to what?" If societal aims are wrong, the urge to socialize children to societal roles becomes circular and self-serving. No amount of amelioration, he writes, including better schools or more social workers—would justify this socialization. Those seeking to correct delinquency, Goodman says, should instead improve society and culture's opportunities to meet the appetites of human nature. Goodman faulted social critics, including himself, and academic sociologists for being content with studying this system without endeavoring to change it. He posits that attempts to mold human nature to social order would backfire, and that "freedom and meaning will outweigh anomie" if given the chance.

To create a society worthy for youth to want to join, Goodman resolves, certain "unfinished" revolutions must be brought to their conclusion on topics including companionship, democracy, free speech, pacifism, progressive education, syndicalism, and technology. He implores readers to pursue these ideals seriously, and to direct their rebellion towards political ends, in the book's final chapter, "The Missing Community".

== Publication ==
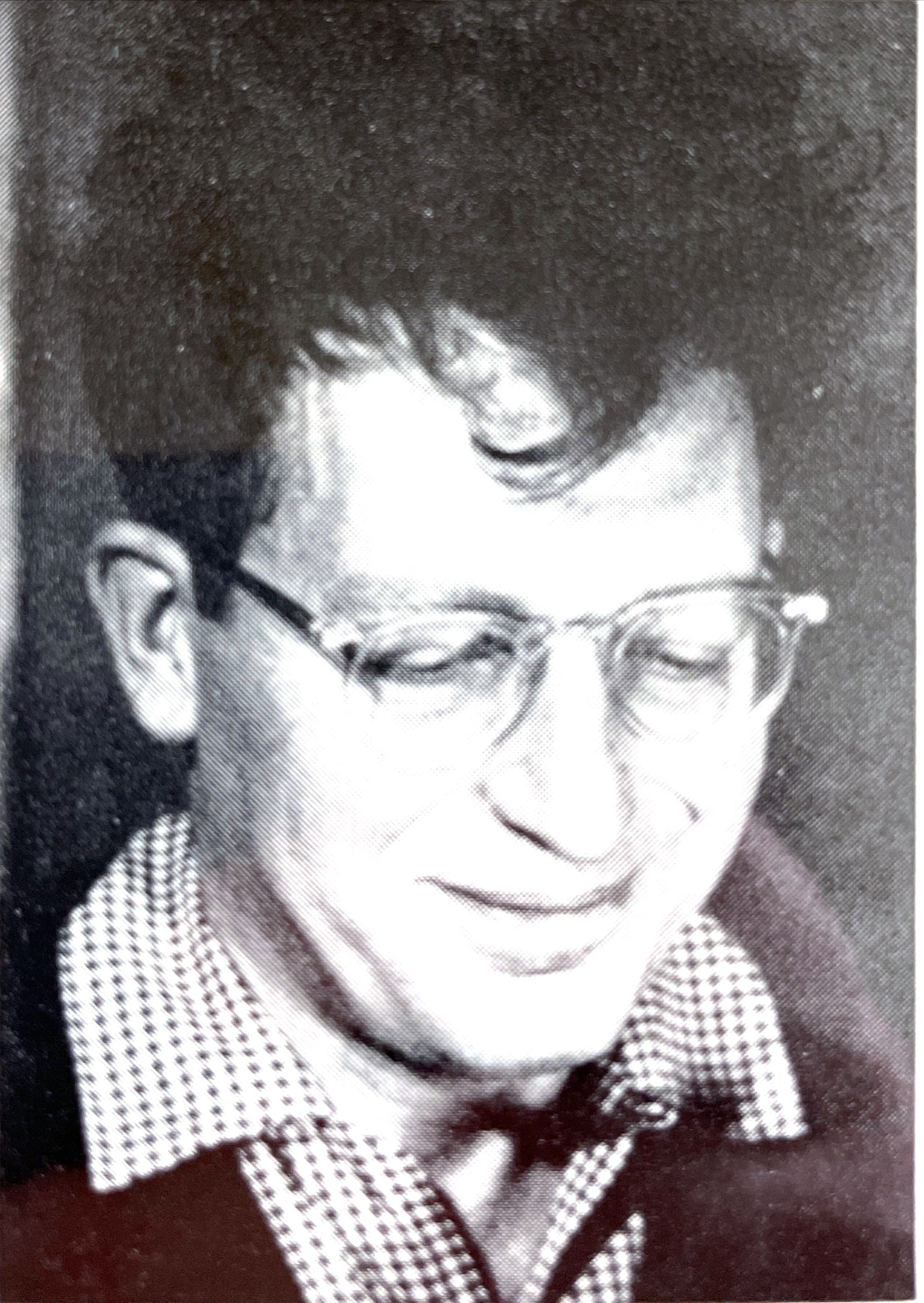
Goodman, c. 1959

Author Paul Goodman had a marginal intellectual career before publishing Growing Up Absurd, both prolific and on the fringe. Throughout the 1950s, Goodman developed his practice of Gestalt therapy and finished his epic novel The Empire City, which ends with its protagonist "spoiling for a fight" against a target the author was unable to articulate. Goodman, who conflated the fictional protagonist with himself, came to conclude that his fictional character's desire for a fight was the author's own, and that it would be "war against the Organized System" to reclaim his sick society from the forces that alienated him. Goodman's Growing Up Absurd was the beginning of this campaign, which would run throughout the rest of the 1960s. Like Goodman's protagonist, Goodman believed that he had to work through his societal alienation by participating in society. He drew from his approach to psychotherapy, which focused on changing societal circumstances rather than his clients.

In late 1958, mainstream editors began to court Goodman for works of social criticism after reading his articles in small political and cultural magazines. Through the winter, he read Washington, Jefferson, Thoreau, and Emerson and considered how he might make his own patriotic intervention in American society. A small New York press, Criterion Books, offered Goodman a $500 advance to write a book on New York's teenage gangs in the summer of mid-1959. The resulting manuscript did not focus on the youth but the American culture and value systems in which the youth were raised. Goodman wrote the manuscript over several weeks that autumn. The final work thematically derived from topics he had been addressing for years, such that some parts were simply quoted from past works. He drew from his personal interactions in New York City, his teaching experience, and his colleagues Benjamin Nelson, Harold Rosenberg, and Elliott Shapiro. The book's section on vocation was informed by Max Weber's essays on vocation.

Goodman wrote in his diary that upon finishing his last chapter, he whistled "The Star-Spangled Banner" as he walked the chapter to his publisher. He saw himself as patriotically defending his country against "the system". Goodman believed that the issues of conformity and alienation described in his manuscript were better expressed as political than as cultural issues. He wanted his political message to be read in advance of the 1960 presidential campaign. The publisher decided not to publish the manuscript and asked Goodman to return the advance for delivering work unfit for print. The manuscript was rejected by 19 publishers, including the publisher that would ultimately print it.

In his memoir, Commentary magazine editor Norman Podhoretz wrote that he had been searching for an "opening salvo" on juvenile delinquency and middle-class youth deviance, a highly publicized topic, to mark his magazine's reimagination as a home for American social criticism. Most treatments of the subject, he wrote, described the phenomenon as "unrelated incidents of individual pathology ... to be dealt with either sternly by the cops or benevolently by the psychiatrists". He heard about Goodman's finished manuscript and had a long-standing admiration for the author's writing and "colloquial directness". Though Podhoretz considered the initial excerpt he read of Goodman's manuscript to be uninteresting, he was impressed by the work as "the very incarnation of the new spirit [he] had been hoping would be at work in the world".

According to Podhoretz's memoir, he excitedly called Random House editor Jason Epstein, whom he convinced to come over and read the manuscript that night. Though Random House had previously rejected the manuscript and Epstein thought Goodman a "has-been", Goodman had a contract the next day. With the book's release planned for later in 1960, Goodman and Podhoretz revised over half the manuscript into three extended serial extracts for the editor's Commentary magazine reboot. These extracts ran in February, March, and April 1960. Extracts also ran in Dissent, Mademoiselle, and Manas around the same time.

Goodman was confident that his message was clear and agreeable. According to Goodman's later literary executor, in Growing Up Absurd Goodman tried a new style that was powerfully earnest, direct, and patient, whereas his prior writing had qualities of hectoring insistence and recklessness. Goodman normally rejected attempts to revise his work, but approved of Random House's appointed book editor. According to Goodman's brother, these were the only edits Goodman permitted in his career.

Random House published the book's first edition in 1960 (Note: Nicely 1979, pp. 71–72: October 21, 1960, specifically.) and Vintage Books printed the first paperback two years later. Growing Up Absurd was translated into French (1971), German (1971), Italian (1964), Japanese (1971), and Spanish (1971). The book's appendices include articles and book reviews by Goodman from the late 1950s. Goodman dedicated Growing Up Absurd to the Gestalt psychotherapist Lore Perls for her role in helping train and mentor him as a therapist, cooling his defiance, and enabling him such that he could write the book. New York Review Books reissued the book in 2012 with a foreword by Casey Nelson Blake.

== Reception ==
Released to initially moderate acclaim, Growing Up Absurd became a bestseller, with 100,000 copies sold in three years and half a million paperback copies printed by 1973. Growing Up Absurd enjoyed wide readership among the New Left and across 1960s college campuses, becoming the foremost book by which 1960s American youth understood themselves. Goodman's ideas proved popular with student activists, and it was said that every activist at Berkeley had a copy, even if few read the full text. Americans had seen isolated headlines on juvenile delinquency but had not noticed the similar patterns between both urban youth and beatnik revolt against societal pressures. To this public, Goodman's literary executor Taylor Stoehr recounted, Growing Up Absurd was "a revelation". Chapters from the book were republished in radical and mainstream magazines. Commentary readers responded positively and the revamped magazine's editor Norman Podhoretz credited the strong response to Growing Up Absurd's serialized extractions for Commentary's quick ascent. Following the book's success, Goodman's publisher expressed interest in reprinting his Communitas. Extracts from Growing Up Absurd later ran in the Evergreen Review and many edited group volumes. In contrast with the American response, the British press panned the book.

Growing Up Absurd was revelatory to readers who had not previously connected the concept of work with ideals, wrote Goodman's literary executor. To this new audience, Goodman read as both fresh and old-fashioned: a contemporary man of letters's unabashed advocacy for a moral culture with traditional values of faith, honor, vocation. Goodman's discussion of the "rat race" and worthwhile work too resonated with college students, who had similar realizations, but was more distant to adults who had grown accustomed to the American nature of work. The book's advocacy for youth's sexual freedom was shocking to older readers, and some accused Goodman of using the book to argue for acceptance of sexual deviance.

Contemporaneously, public intellectual John K. Galbraith described Goodman's book as hard to read from its title to its appendix, in contrast to the increasingly commonplace slick and superficial mass market works of criticism. Dwight Macdonald too lamented Goodman's writing being less clear than his thinking, though Macdonald admired Growing Up Absurd among Goodman's oeuvre. Literary critic Kingsley Widmer described Goodman's rhetoric as varying between righteousness, condescension, and magnanimity. As one later reviewer put it, Goodman was not supporting youth as much as psychologizing them and their societal alienation.

Some critics focused on Goodman's ability to offer solutions. That youth want meaningful work, said The Times Literary Supplement, is a tautology. Though it is easier to puritanically agree with Goodman's assessment of societal downfalls, the reviewer said, it is harder to ascertain why we agree with these aims yet cannot seem to achieve them. In this way, Goodman banked too heavily on the miraculous changing of minds rather than meeting people where they were. Galbraith's New York Times review considered Growing Up Absurd a "serious effort" despite not offering robust solutions.

On the occasion of the book's 2012 reprint, one retrospective reviewer considered the book's core issues of corporate greed and spiritual barrenness as being more pronounced than 50 years prior. Literary critic Adam Kirsch wrote that Goodman's focus on work with meaning was priced out of possibility in a highly stratified contemporary culture, in which working multiple jobs to provide for basic necessities leaves little time for consideration of work's meaning.

== Legacy ==
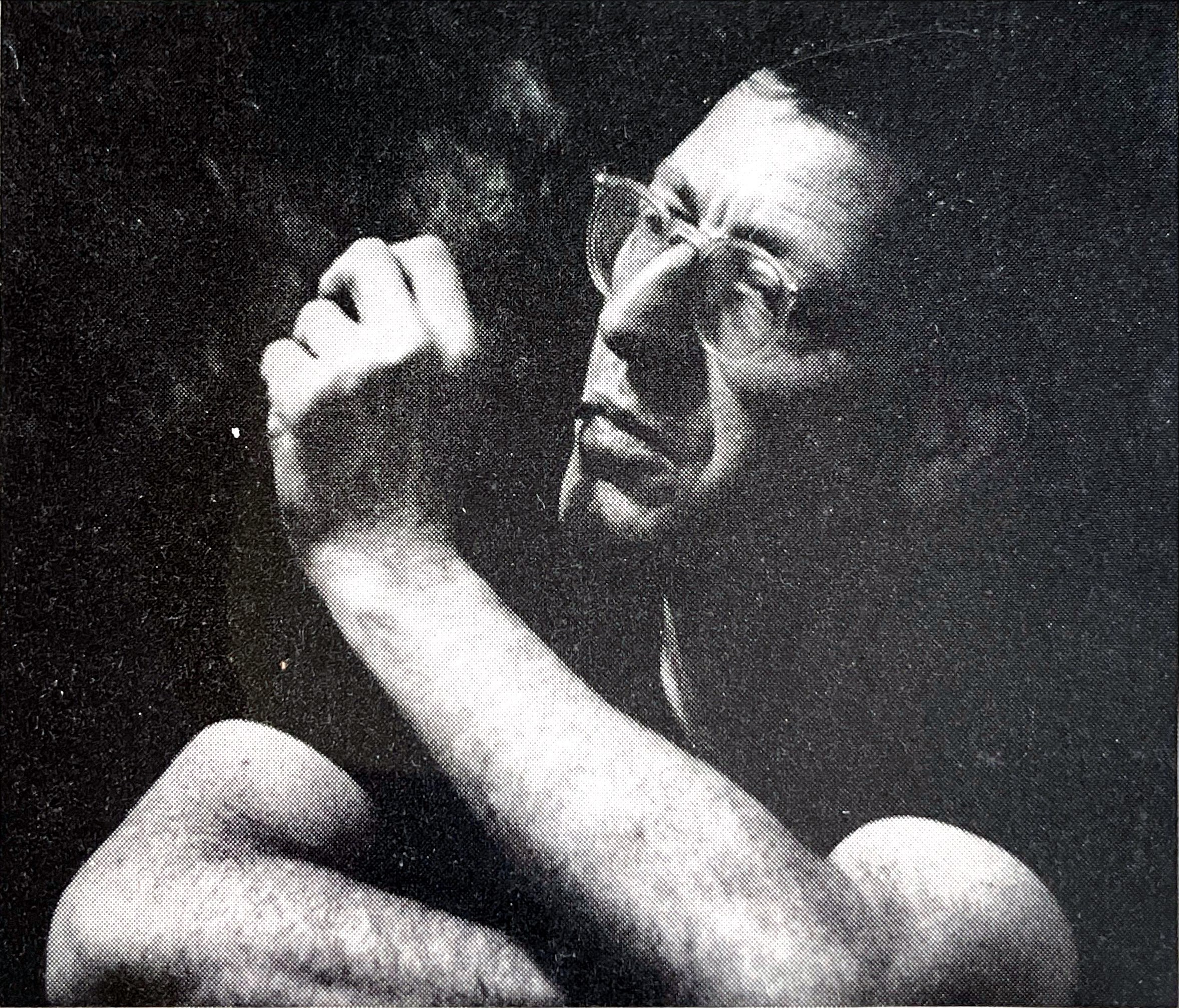
The author, c. 1964

Fueled by the changing desires of the times, including a willingness to address societal issues, Growing Up Absurd transformed Goodman's outcast career and brought him public fame as a social critic and educational theorist. He emerged from the publication with attention he had long sought and a role as a public intellectual. Some of Goodman's ideas have been assimilated into mainstream thought: local community autonomy and decentralization, better balance between rural and urban life, morality-led technological advances, break-up of regimented schooling, art in mass media, and a culture less focused on a wasteful standard of living. His systemic societal critique was adopted by 1960s New Left radicals, whose aspirations included an emphasis on moral living. Growing Up Absurd's main contribution, literary critic Kingsley Widmer contended, was in focusing public attention "on the discontents of the young and the lack of humane values in much of our technocracy".

Goodman bridged the 1950s era of mass conformity and repression into the 1960s era of youth counterculture in his encouragement of dissent. He became a popular guest speaker both for the book's resonance with 1960s youth and for his criticism of the youth movement's excesses. He was invited to lecture at hundreds of colleges and presented as a "public gadfly" agitating for change. Widmer believed that the practical idealism Goodman had wanted for the young was partially realized in the 1964 Berkeley Free Speech Movement. As 1960s campus rebellions suggested the possibility of greater societal change, Goodman and the youth shared mutual sympathies for several years.

Though some criticized his flattery of his young followers, Goodman also played the role of their Dutch uncle, receiving the respect of the 1960s youth generation despite issuing harsh opinions about them. His followers misinterpreted the source of the author's rebellion, according to Goodman's literary executor. Whereas the youth saw Goodman's outré positions on art, politics, and sexuality as principled defiance, they were more accurately Goodman's own idiosyncratic personal refusal to acquiesce to societal norms. Both interpretations built his affinity with the youth, as did his emphasis on older ideals, acts, and individuals in which youth could feel a sense of justified pride. Goodman often reminded his young audiences of their inexperience and encouraged them to pursue vocational mastery if they wanted to make a better world. Literary critic Adam Kirsch retrospectively suggested that Goodman appealed to the youth by flattering their ignorance and sense of moral superiority. This demagoguery, wrote Kirsch, belied Goodman's responsibility as an elder teacher to help the youth to find contentment in an imperfect world rife with evils and suffering, rather than holding out for a perfect world as the only acceptable world.

Many specific details of the book soon became dated. Youth gangs persisted, but juvenile delinquency as a topic did not, and the disaffected beatniks successively traded favor for hippies and punks. Though world politics were not a central focus, Cold War-era historical touchpoints pervade the book. Goodman also underemphasized the role of racial conflict, as his discussion of impoverished youth focused mainly on socioeconomic needs. As criticism of American society, Growing Up Absurd appeared mild by the beginning of the 1970s, according to Merle Miller.

Goodman's patriarchal assumptions about gender and treatment of women, exemplified in his focus on "man's work", were rebuked in early reviews and in the following decades. In particular, he wrote that the book focuses exclusively on men and their careers because women, having the capacity for childbirth, did not need a career to justify their worth. (Note: Even this justification was an afterthought, having been added after his opening chapter first appeared in Dissent.) By his literary executor's account, this was a blind spot for Goodman. Retrospective reviews reproached Goodman's analytic exclusion of women and one cited it as sufficient reason to not want for a "Goodman revival". Goodman's analysis of men similarly narrows to "manly" lad culture, excluding those from upper-class or non-urban backgrounds.

Looking back on Goodman's career, Kingsley Widmer panned Growing Up Absurd as rough, rambling, and mediocre despite its insights and sociological vision. Overall, Widmer considered Goodman's analysis of vocational and community issues to be unserious, and Goodman's thoughts on decentralization and schooling to be better expressed in other works.

Growing Up Absurd was among the first works of American school social criticism in a 1960s body of literature that became known as the romantic critics of education. Critics of public schools borrowed the book's ideas for years after its publication, and his ideas on education reverberated for decades. Adam Kirsch wrote that Goodman's "acute, compassionate observations" about childhood under modern conditions and portrayal of "childhood as a pastoral paradise lost" contributes to the book's continued staying power.

Growing Up Absurd was continually in print as of 1990 but was not in high demand as a classic. Although the book made him well-known, Goodman's public interest peaked with his late 1960s youth readership. His influence never took hold in the wider public, and within decades Goodman was largely forgotten from public consciousness. His literary executor wrote that much of Goodman's effectiveness relied on his electric, cantankerous presence. Over time, the idea of "the system" entered common language and ceased to be a rallying cry. Into the 21st century, Growing Up Absurd continues to appeal to "the adolescent's private sense of being misunderstood by a heartless and empty world" as young readers share online how the book has affected their lives.

== Bibliography ==
- Flanzbaum, Hilene (October 26, 2012). "A Spokesman for About Half of His Generation". The Forward. pp. 15, 17. ISSN 1051-340X. ProQuest 1124447774. Archived from the original on October 9, 2022.
- Galbraith, John K. (October 30, 1960). "It's Purpose That Counts (Rev. of Growing Up Absurd)". The New York Times Book Review. pp. 10, 12. ISSN 0028-7806.
- Ellerby, John (January 1962). "Youth and Absurdity". Anarchy (11): 13–16. ISSN 0003-2751.
- Goodman, Paul (1966). Five Years. New York: Brussel & Brussel. OCLC 284500.
- Kirsch, Adam (November 16, 2012). "Forever Young". New Statesman. 141 (5132): 42–43. ISSN 1364-7431. EBSCOhost 83465834. Archived from the original on April 2, 2015.
- Kostelanetz, Richard (1969). "Paul Goodman: Persistence and Prevalence". Master Minds: Portraits of Contemporary American Artists and Intellectuals. New York: Macmillan. pp. 270–288. OCLC 23458.
- Laski, Marghanita (March 31, 1961). "Why Do Lions Not Eat Straw? (Rev. of Growing Up Absurd)". The Times Literary Supplement (3083): 204. ISSN 0307-661X.
- Mattson, Kevin (2002). "Paul Goodman, Anarchist Reformer: The Politics of Decentralization". Intellectuals in Action: The Origins of the New Left and Radical Liberalism, 1945–1970. University Park, PA: Penn State University Press. pp. 97–144. ISBN 978-0-271-05428-5. JSTOR 10.5325/j.ctt7v4k3.
- Nicely, Tom (1979). Adam and His Work: A Bibliography of Sources by and about Paul Goodman (1911–1972). Metuchen, NJ: Scarecrow Press. ISBN 978-0-8108-1219-2. OCLC 4832535.
- Parisi, Peter, ed. (1986). Artist of the Actual: Essays on Paul Goodman. Metuchen, NJ: Scarecrow Press. ISBN 978-0-8108-1843-9. OCLC 12418868.
- Pells, Richard H. (1985). "Conformity and Alienation: Social Criticism in the 1950s". The Liberal Mind in a Conservative Age: American Intellectuals in the 1940s and 1950s. New York: Harper & Row. pp. 183–261. ISBN 978-0-06-015351-9.
- Podhoretz, Norman (1967). Making It. New York: Random House. OCLC 292070.
- Stoehr, Taylor (Fall 1990). "Growing Up Absurd—Again: Re-reading Paul Goodman in the Nineties". Dissent. No. 37. pp. 486–494. ISSN 0012-3846.
- —— (1994). Here Now Next: Paul Goodman and the Origins of Gestalt Therapy. San Francisco: Jossey-Bass. ISBN 978-0-7879-0005-2. OCLC 30029013.
- Widmer, Kingsley (1980). Paul Goodman. Boston: Twayne. ISBN 0-8057-7292-8. OCLC 5725979.
