= The May Pamphlet =

1945 anarchist essays by Paul Goodman

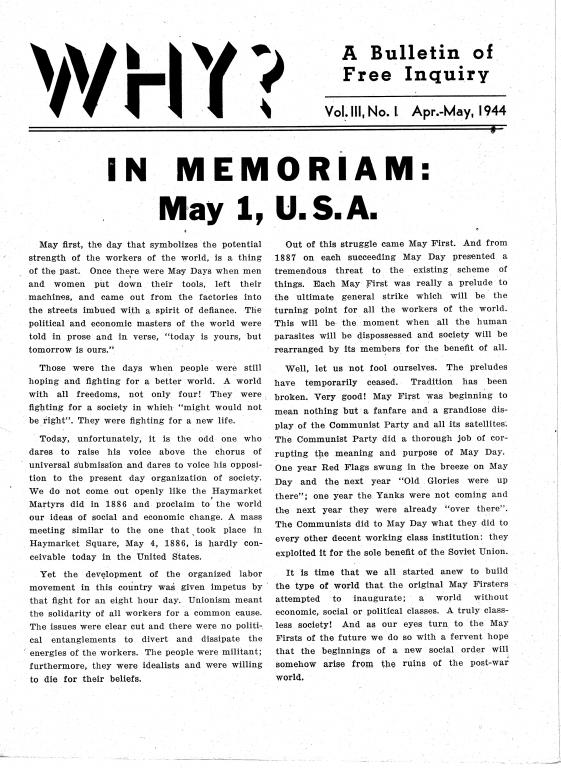
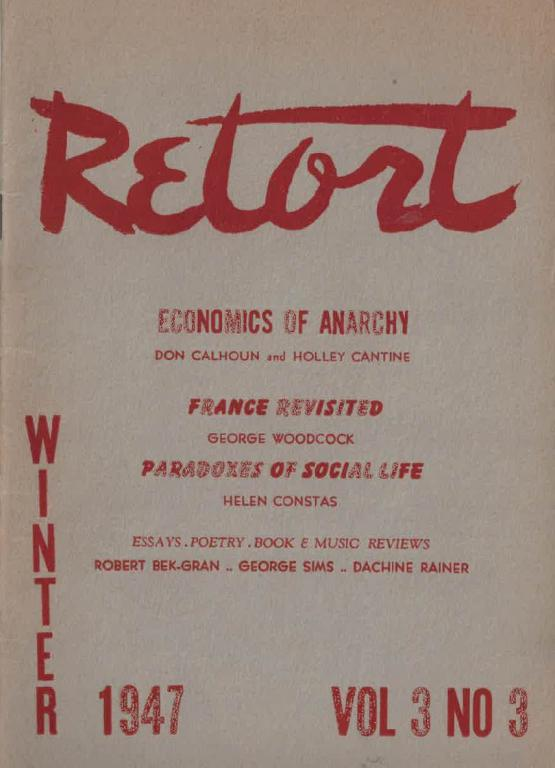
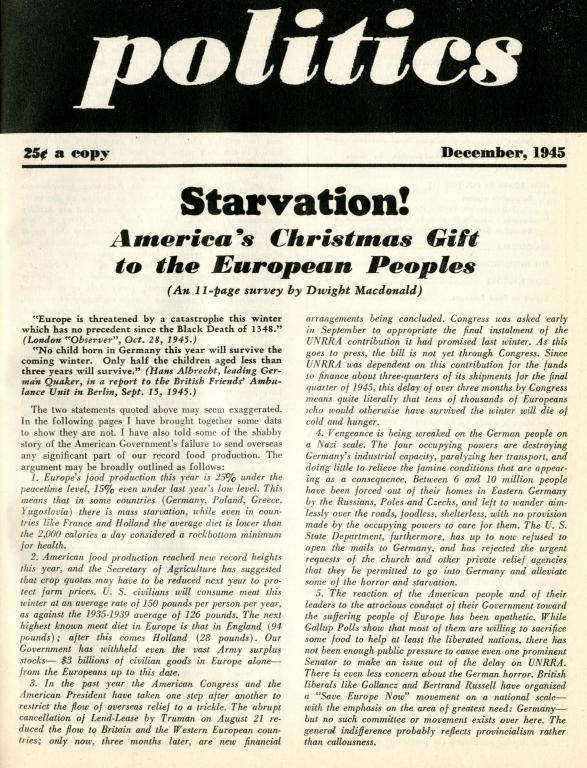
The essays that became known as The May Pamphlet were originally published in small, anarchist journals.

The May Pamphlet is a collection of six anarchist essays written and published by Paul Goodman in 1945. Goodman discusses the problems of living in a society that represses individual instinct through coercion. He suggests that individuals resist such conditions by reclaiming their natural instincts and initiative, and by "drawing the line", an ideological delineation beyond which an individual should refuse to conform or cooperate with social convention. While themes from The May Pamphlet—decentralization, peace, social psychology, youth liberation—would recur throughout his works, Goodman's later social criticism focused on practical applications rather than theoretical concerns.

The pamphlet was originally published piecemeal in small, New York anarchist journals and was first compiled as a set among literary essays in Art and Social Nature (1946). The essays were not well known before Goodman's 1960 book Growing Up Absurd led to a resurgence of interest in his oeuvre, including the pamphlet's republication in Drawing the Line (1962). The May Pamphlet was Goodman's principal contribution to anarchist theory and a primary influence on Colin Ward, who later dedicated Anarchy in Action to Goodman's memory.

== Publication ==
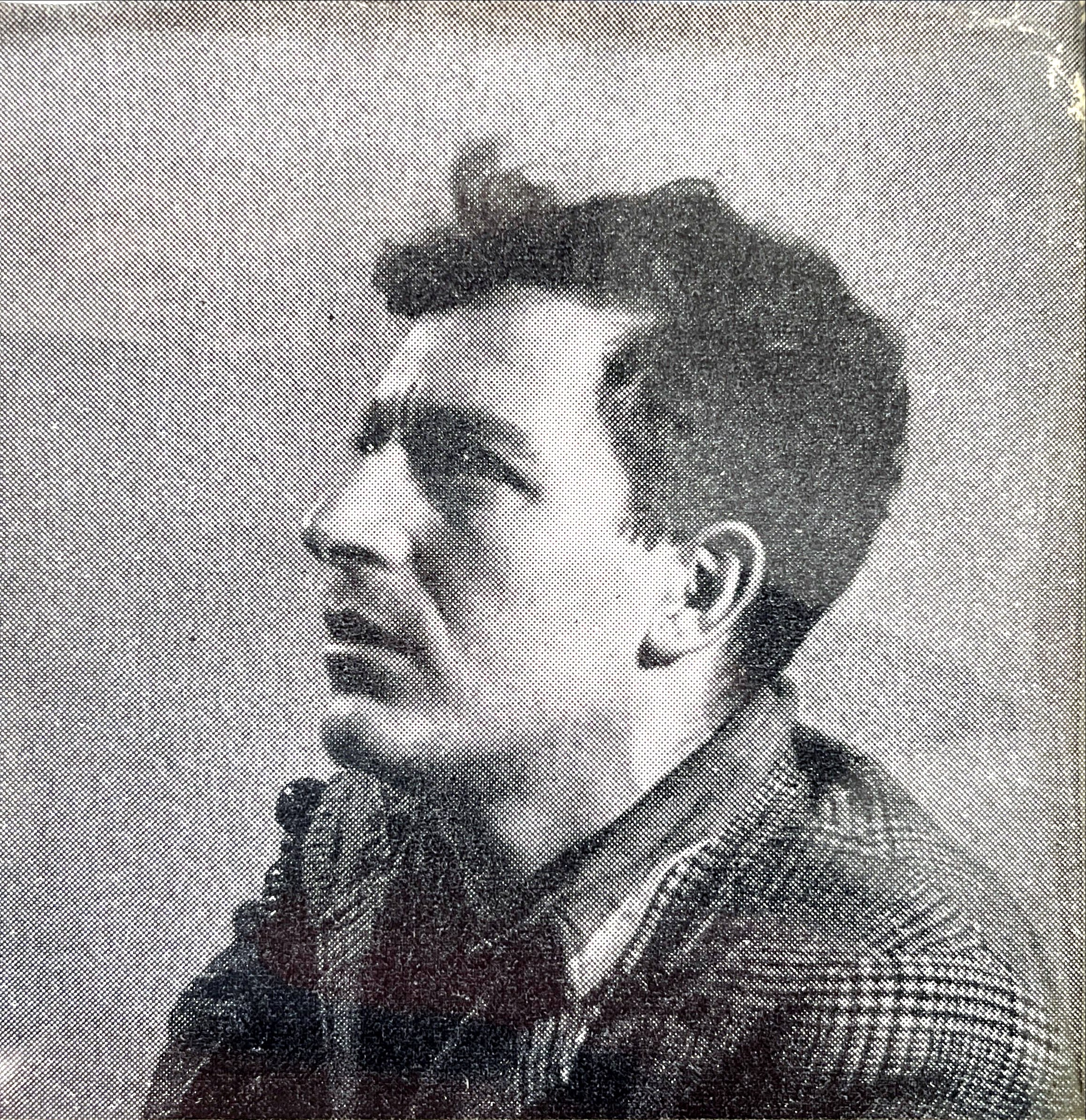
The author in the late 1940s

Before he became one of the best-known American literary anarchists of his time, Paul Goodman first articulated his political beliefs in the 1940s. Propelled by his rejection of the World War II draft, his anarcho-pacifist peers, and the ugliness of wartime social conditions, Goodman authored the essays that would become The May Pamphlet in May and early June 1945, with the exception of "Revolution, Sociolatry, and War", written in October. He started the essays in advance of his May 1945 draft interview and, according to one story, brought the manuscript with him as he proceeded to portray himself as incorrigible and unfit for the military. Having been dismissed from the war-supporting Partisan Review and influential New York literary circles for refusing to jettison his pacifism, Goodman turned to the city's marginal, bohemian communities. He published in several small, anarchist journals and was influential in the circles behind each. Three of these journals—Why? An Anarchist Bulletin, Retort, and Politics—each published an essay in what would later be compiled as The May Pamphlet.

The full pamphlet was first compiled and released in Goodman's 1946 book Art and Social Nature. Irving Novick's one-man publishing imprint, Vinco, produced the book, which sold poorly. Art and Social Nature placed Goodman's anarchist essays alongside his literary essays. The author considered the topics to have overlap, as he considered societal order to be mostly a matter of aesthetics. The May Pamphlet was the book's opening section, composed of Goodman's anarchist short essays from 1945. Another publisher, Alexander Katz, read "Revolution, Sociolatry, and War" in Politics and became interested in Goodman. Katz bought the book's unsold copies in purchasing Vinco, which he renamed the Arts and Science Press when establishing his own one-man imprint in the late 1940s.

As Growing Up Absurd (1960) launched Goodman's career as a social critic, Goodman revised the pamphlet for republication and swapped its essay sequence in his 1962 book Drawing the Line. After Goodman's death in 1972, his literary executor Taylor Stoehr used this revised version in the 1977 reissue of Drawing the Line, which Stoehr expanded to include other political essays by Goodman, such as a new essay on "Crisis and New Spirit". The May Pamphlet was translated and published in German (Anarchistisches Manifest) in 1977.

== Synopsis ==
In The May Pamphlet, Goodman discusses the problems of living within a society that impedes individual initiative and imposes on personal liberties, i.e., coercive societal conditions. His thesis, with debt to Wilhelm Reich, is that a coercive society depends on repression of individual instinct, to which the antidote is for individuals to take initiative and form a "natural society" in the present rather than waiting for large-scale structural changes. The original, 49-page May Pamphlet contains six essays:

A free society cannot be the substituting of a "new order" for the old order; it is the extension of spheres of free action until they make up most of the social life. ... Free action is to live in the present society as though it were a natural society.

— The May Pamphlet
1. "Reflections on Drawing the Line"
2. "On Treason Against Natural Societies" – originally published in Retort, Fall 1945
3. "A Touchstone for the Libertarian Program" – originally published in Why?, June 1945
4. "Natural Violence"
5. "Revolution, Sociolatry, and War" – originally published in Politics, December 1945
6. "Unanimity"

Throughout The May Pamphlet, Goodman uses the word "libertarian", referring to the libertarian socialist (i.e., anarchist) tradition, as was its common connotation in that era. (Note: Since the 19th century, "libertarian" has referred to advocates for freedom of the will, or anyone who generally advocated for liberty. During the time of The May Pamphlet and as invoked by Goodman, "libertarian" was synonymous with anarchism (anti-authoritarian, libertarian socialism). The term's definition has become more ambiguous since the late 20th century as the American free-market libertarian movement adopted the same name. See Marshall 1992, p. 641 and Cohn 2009, pp. 4, 6; for more, see definition of libertarianism.)

The first short essay, "Reflections on Drawing the Line", describes inventiveness as a necessary condition of libertarianism (anarchism). Goodman sees libertarianism as the fulfillment of "natural powers": that individuals produce art and society by living their nature. "Free action is to live in present society as though it were a natural society" goes the pamphlet's main maxim. Goodman writes that new order should not simply replace old order, but instead, spheres of free action should expand until they compose the totality of a free society, though Goodman does also contend that "any genuine liberation" requires "total change". The exact meaning of "free" and "natural" is imprecise in this context yet generally refers to the ability to work in mutual aid without coercive legal pressure to do otherwise. His examples of coercive restrictions include industrial labor's restraints on time and specialty, and adult "lack of encouragement" towards childhood sexuality. The title's "Drawing the Line" refers to establishing the limits, as a line in the sand, beyond which an individual would act in resistance. But Goodman conservatively advocates for non-allegiance in lieu of open insurrection. Goodman embodied this stance by living a free, "sexually polymorphous bohemian-artist life" in defiance of societal norms.

Goodman faults modern society and its focus on industry for man's alienation from nature, thus causing disaffection, coercion, and war. He refers to this trade-off as "sociolatry", that the masses, alienated from nature, enable industrial progress in hopes of a higher standard of living. In this way, their unconscious desires are coerced into behavioral norms in the name of institutional power. Goodman's solution is a return to nature in which individuals reconnect with their natural urges and powers to pursue meaningful work, mutual aid, and direct democracy. The revolutionary potential of this redirection of energies rests in individual decisions, not necessarily collective action.

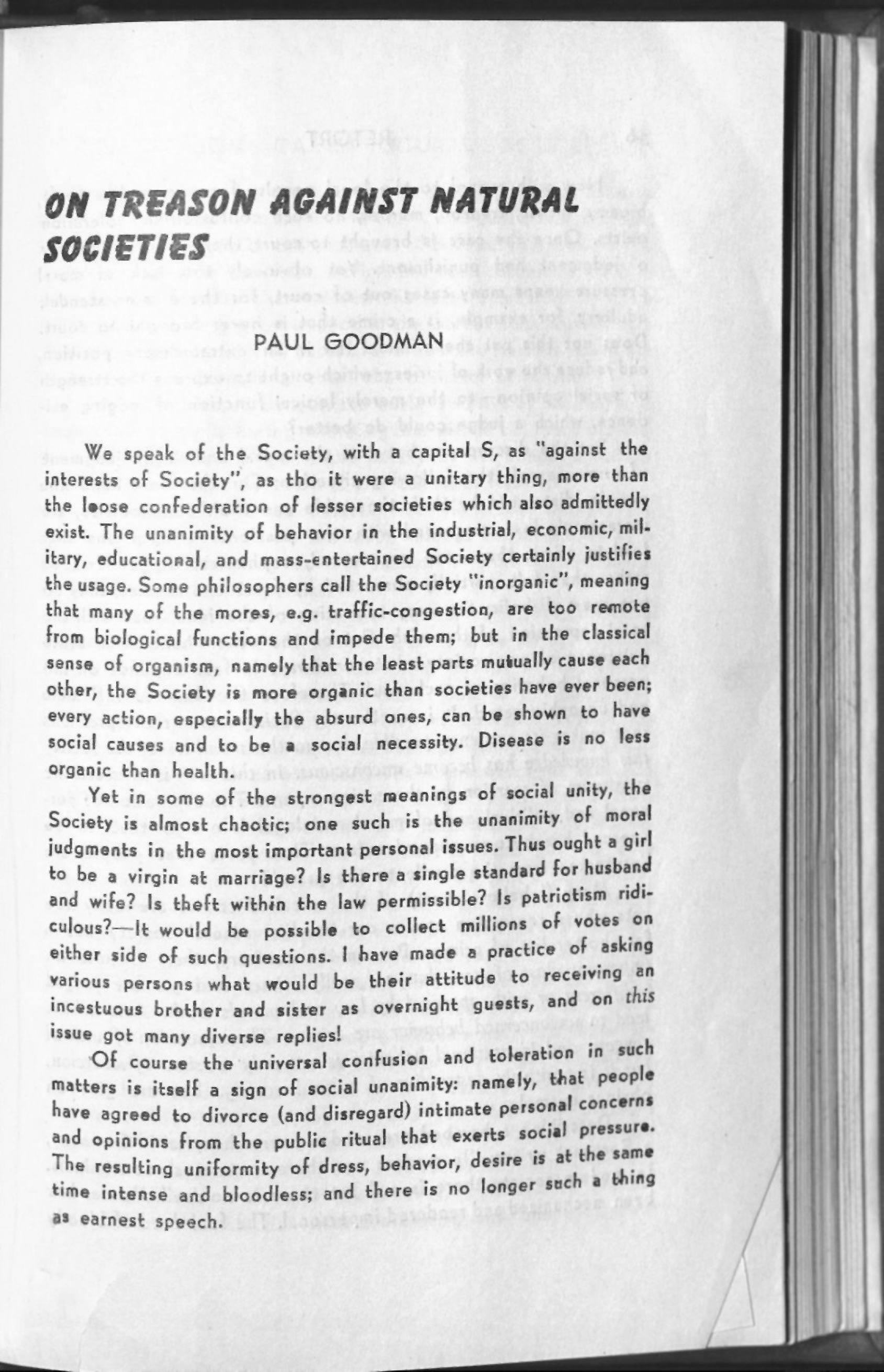
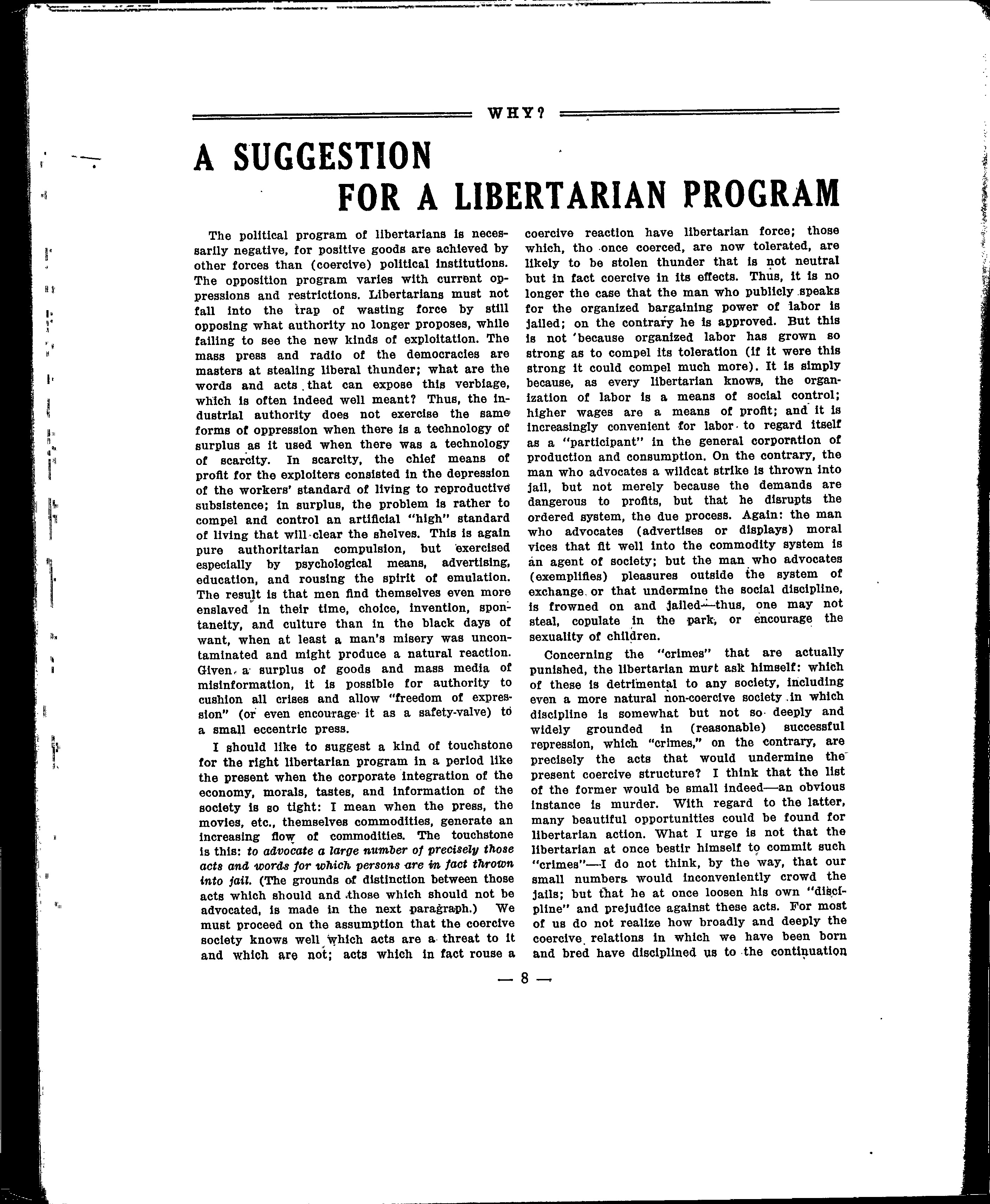
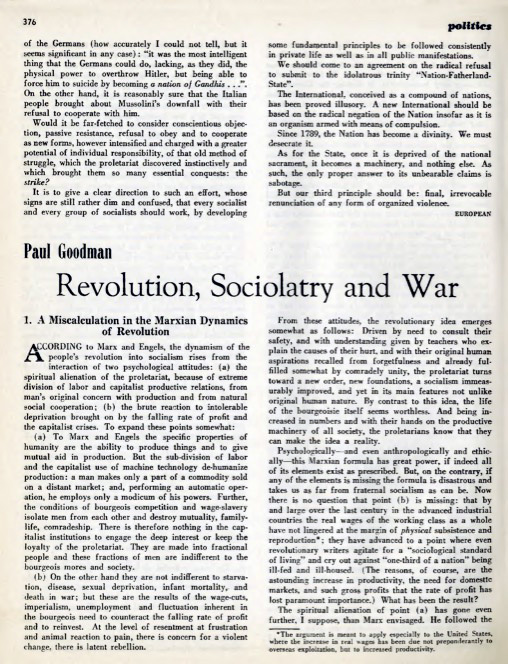
The first printings of "On Treason Against Natural Societies", "A Touchstone for the Libertarian Program", and "Revolution, Sociolatry, and War" (1945)

The second essay discusses the personal, therapeutic benefits of small acts of resistance. To Goodman, "Treason Against Natural Societies" meant the self-betrayal in which an individual internally knows they are being coerced against their nature but instead "cowardly takes leave of his heart" and conforms. This ability to betray one's better instinct, he writes, is what enables a war.

"A Touchstone for the Libertarian Program", the third essay, encourages libertarians (i.e., anarchists) to dilute their prejudices against jailable offenses and in fact advocate on behalf of such offenses which, he wagers, are more likely political in nature. He praises marginalized personal behavior ("acts of liberty") as "our strongest propaganda" and contends that most jailable offenses are political non-crimes: free expressions whose repression encourages timidity. If prisoners were released, he argues, an increase in petty crime would likely deter bigger, more spectacular crime. Goodman notes this proposal as being impossible as moral relations and property depend on the existence of prison.

The fourth essay, "Natural Violence", blames the "sterilization" of natural experiences—such as birth, death, and sex—for aggressive deviance, such as war ("war is unnatural violence").

The May Pamphlet's last two essays are more theoretical. Similar to other essays first published in Politics, "Revolution, Sociolatry, and War", is an anarchist response to Marxist theory. Goodman approves of Karl Marx's social psychology but disagrees on topics of statism and history. In discussing American societal structure, Goodman proposes reliance on small, communitarian groups based in mutual aid in lieu of large states and corporations. Goodman argues that his 1940s society was built to serve industrial progress at the expense of individual alienation from their natural abilities. Those external institutions, with their narrow focus on socioeconomic progress, he wrote, are weak substitutes for small sets of individuals working in mutuality and decentralized syndicalism to realize their personal desires. The immediate creation of these small communities would produce individual fulfillment through meaningful work and direct participation in decision-making, like "sane men in a madhouse", undoing a society that had grown big, anonymous, oriented towards mass consumption, and whose decisions and design were increasingly made externally from those affected. Goodman expects routine aggression to be relieved by "natural institutions" such as friendly competition and mutual interdependence.

"Unanimity", the sixth and final essay, argues that only invention can resolve natural conflict. "If a man cannot invent a way out", Goodman asks, "what right has such a man to be a libertarian on the issue at all?" He faults negative criticism for unproductively dispiriting individuals where positive criticism—a tenor throughout Goodman's social criticism—can offer possibilities for improvement and self-actualization. He proposes that individuals connect their creative efforts to their deeper, psychoanalytic needs—their nature—and to wider wisdom of the community. Goodman puts special emphasis on unanimity as opposed to rough consensus, and writes that unanimity is found by "sharpening" the point of conflict until a new idea emerges. The act of unifying one's social and political attitudes, he additionally suggests, has therapeutic effects. Goodman views his commentary as standard anarchism to which he has added elements of psychoanalysis.

== Themes and analysis ==
The major themes of The May Pamphlet include how individuals can resist coercive societal conditions and invent solutions to social dilemmas by realizing their natural abilities. Goodman believed that individual initiative—sociobiological drives and animal instinct in defiance of norms—and the everyday conflict it created to be the purpose of living, the foundation for communities, and a trait to nurture. Goodman proposes that individuals realize their natural abilities and apply them creatively rather than letting them be co-opted by coercive pressures within society. Individuals could be free in a coercive society, he wrote, through pursuit of creative work, acts of passion or emotion, and "spontaneous recreation". The duties of citizenship, to Goodman, entail dismantling the institutional barriers that separate people from life's basic circumstances. He wrote about "waging peace" as one would "wage war".

Though the essays do not prompt for specific actions, Goodman generally suggests approaches such as avoiding societal coercion in the manner one avoids anything dangerous in the everyday, or "drawing the line", an ideological delineation beyond which an individual should refuse to conform or cooperate with social convention. To allay the confrontation that comes with drawing the line, he advocates for individuals to do what is within one's own nonconfrontational power: reform oneself rather than attempt to influence others directly, remove oneself from coercive situations to instead find affinity groups closer to one's identity. Goodman prefers this anarchist system of self-identifying and adjusting one's own prejudices so as to permit a loose worldview that can afford multiple contradictory views. He simultaneously proposes civil disobedience as a core facet of anarchism: that individuals should exercise moral conscience to challenge societal coercion, even if that exercise is a jailable crime. In turn this would, Goodman argued, help individuals better distinguish political prisoners from common criminals. The essays generally encourage draft and war resistance, though he does not specifically address the draft or his pacifism in these essays.

Goodman likely wrote these essays from his need to justify his draft dodging, according to his literary executor Taylor Stoehr. Goodman's politics derived from his personal situation as a meditation on how to cope, which Stoehr described as visible throughout the essays. These principles largely served Goodman well, wrote Goodman's biographer, and Goodman's reliance on instinct was sometimes among his most endearing traits, except when he could not identify his deeper instincts and could neither articulate his confusion nor admit it.

While themes from The May Pamphlet—decentralization, peace, social psychology, youth liberation—would recur throughout his later body of work, his social criticism came to focus on practical application rather than theoretical concerns, like that of unanimity.

== Reception and legacy ==
The May Pamphlet was Goodman's main contribution to anarchist theory. The essays were both his first explicitly political works and his foremost political writings of the period. The pamphlet, with its notable absence of class analysis, departed from radical conventions. The Party of Eros, an intellectual history of the New Left, remarked that The May Pamphlet had more in common with writings on Ancient Greek direct democracy than those on Marxist or Syndicalist working-class radicalism. The essays were influential on the central position of the New York Why? Group, who were disenchanted with traditional anarchism, alienated from rising pro-war fervor, and excited by politics that put gradual, individual change before millenarian, collective conflict. Goodman reformulated anarchist politics to elevate issues of expression, such as discrimination and conscription, as existential hazards for freedom and well-being. Goodman's early anarchist thought was also influential in Politics's development of its pacifist, nonviolent, individualist socialist, anti-mass society political stance. The May Pamphlet was a primary influence on British anarchist Colin Ward, who dedicated the 1973 Anarchy in Action to Goodman's memory.

The essays outlined the conceptual positions and convictions that would undergird Goodman's entire career, namely that his contemporaneous American society deprived its people of vital, human needs, leading their animal desires to be sublimated into war spirit, materialistic consumption, and racism. This created what Goodman called "The Dilemma", that one could either conform to society and be sick for deprivation of basic needs, or not confirm and become demented as an exile from vital societal connection. Goodman's 1962 Utopian Essays and Practical Proposals discusses ways in which The May Pamphlet's principles could perform under direct action or policy.

Art and Social Nature and its cornerstone, The May Pamphlet, established Goodman as a noteworthy cultural theorist, despite it being mostly ignored at its release. Goodman would sustain The May Pamphlet's anarchist social critique for the rest of his life and continued to refine its ideas in works including Growing Up Absurd, the 1960 study of alienated youth in America that established his importance as a mainstream cultural theorist and pillar of leftist thought during the counterculture. The May Pamphlet saw a wider audience when Growing Up Absurd brought about a resurgence of Goodman's writing. Through his influence, the stances of the 1940s New York anarchist magazines prefigured the activism and personal empowerment stances of the 1960s New Left.

== See also ==
- Prefigurative politics
