= Adolph Gottlieb =

American abstract expressionist painter, sculptor and printmaker (1903–1974)

- Gottlieb in East Hampton
- Born: March 14, 1903; New York City, U.S.
- Died: March 4, 1974 (aged 70); New York City, U.S.
- Known for: Painting, sculpture
- Movement: Abstract expressionist

Adolph Gottlieb (March 14, 1903 – March 4, 1974) was an American abstract expressionist painter who also made sculpture and became a printmaker.

== Early life and education ==
Gottlieb, one of the "first generation" of Abstract Expressionists, was born in New York City in 1903 to Jewish parents. From 1920 to 1921 he studied at the Art Students League of New York, after which, having determined to become an artist he left high school at the age of 17 and worked his passage to Europe on a merchant ship. He traveled in France and Germany for a year. He lived in Paris for six months during which time he visited the Louvre Museum every day and audited classes at the Académie de la Grande Chaumière. He spent the next year traveling in Germany, Austria, Czechoslovakia and other parts of Central Europe, visiting museums and art galleries. When he returned, he was one of the most traveled New York Artists. After his return to New York, he studied at the Art Students League of New York, Parsons School of Design, Cooper Union and Educational Alliance.

== 1920s and 1930s ==
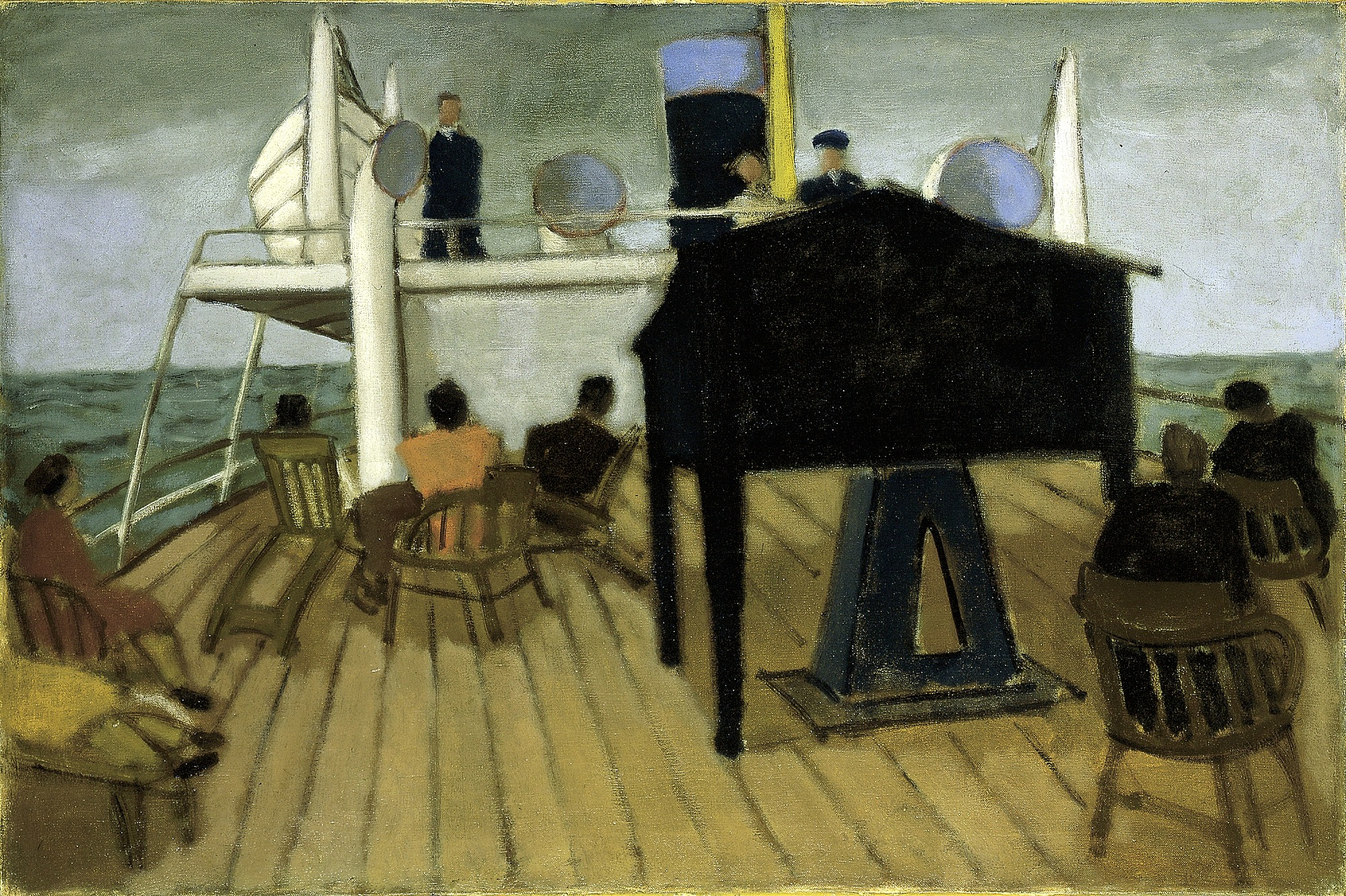
Sun Deck (1936), created while Gottlieb worked for the Federal Art Project

Gottlieb had his first solo exhibition at the Dudensing Galleries in New York City in 1930. During the 1920s and early 1930s he formed lifelong friendships with other artists such as Barnett Newman, Mark Rothko, David Smith, Milton Avery and John Graham. In 1935 he and a group of artists including Ben-Zion, Joseph Solman, Ilya Bolotowsky, Ralph Rosenborg, Louis Harris, Mark Rothko and Louis Schanker, known as "The Ten", exhibited their works together until 1940.

During that period Gottlieb made a living with a variety of part-time jobs and worked on the Federal Art Project in 1936. From September 1937 to June 1938, Gottlieb lived in the Arizona desert, outside of Tucson. In those nine months, he radically changed his approach to painting. He moved from an expressionist-realist style to an approach that combined elements of surrealism and formalist abstraction, using objects and scenes from the local environment as symbols to remove temporality from his work. He transitioned from this into more Surrealist works like the Sea Chest, which displays mysterious incongruities on an otherwise normal landscape.

Here he conveys to the viewer the expansiveness he must have felt looking at Arizona desert sky, although he distills this expansiveness into a more basic abstract form: "I think the emotional feeling I had was that it was like being at sea …Then there's the tremendous clarity – out in Arizona there's a tremendous clarity of light and at night the clouds seem very close." When these Arizona works were exhibited in New York after Gottlieb's return they created a break with Gottlieb's former circle of colleagues, several of whom condemned his new work for being "too abstract".

== 1940s–1950s ==
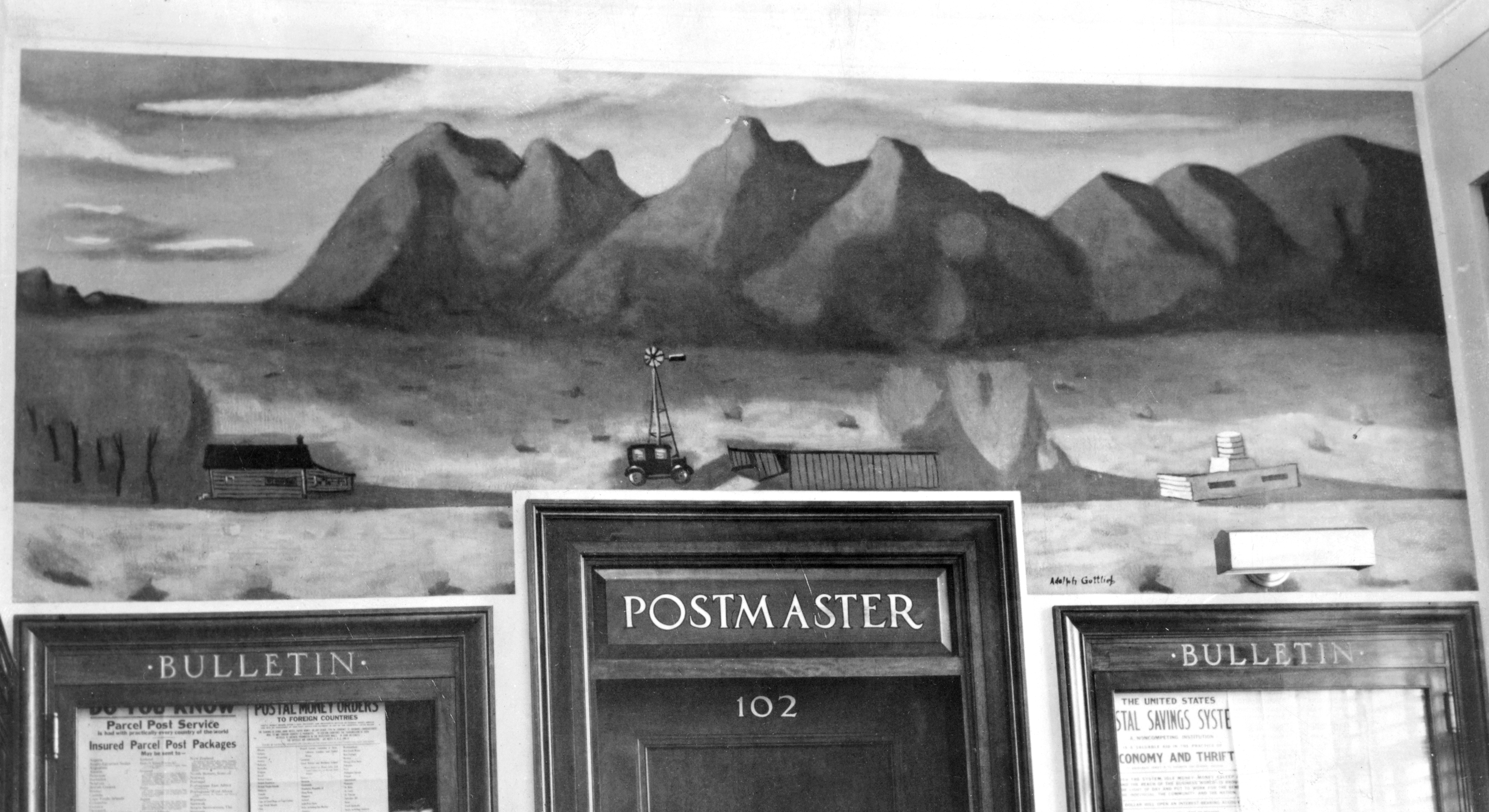
Homestead on the Plain (1941), Gottlieb's Section of Painting and Sculpture mural for the U.S. post office in Yerington, Nevada

Gottlieb and a small circle of friends valued the work of the Surrealist artists they saw exhibited in New York in the 1930s. They also exchanged copies of the magazine "Cahiers d'art" and were quite familiar with current ideas about automatic writing and unconscious imagery. Gottlieb painted a few works in a Surrealist style in 1940 and 1941. The results of his experiments manifested themselves in his series "Pictographs" which spanned from 1941 to 1950. In his painting Voyager's Return , he juxtaposes these images in compartmentalized spaces. His images appear similar to those of indigenous populations of North America and the Ancient Near East. If he found out one of his symbols was not original, he no longer used it.

In 1941, disappointed with the art around him, he developed the approach he called Pictographs. Gottlieb's pictographs, which he created from 1941 to 1954, are one of the first coherent bodies of mature painting by an American of his generation.

Gottlieb spoke of his painting concerns in a 1947 statement:

The role of artist has always been that of image-maker. Different times require different images. Today, when our aspirations have been reduced to a desperate attempt to escape from evil, and times are out of joint, our obsessive, subterranean and pictographic images are the expression of the neurosis which is our reality. To my mind certain so-called abstraction is not abstraction at all. On the contrary, it is the realism of our time.

In May 1942, his first "pictograph" was displayed at the second annual exhibition of the Federation of Modern Painters and Sculptors, located at the Wildenstein Galleries in New York In his pictographs, he introduced a new way of approaching abstraction that included imagery drawn from his 'subconscious' but which notably departed from the idea of narrative. To meet this goal Gottlieb presented images inserted into sections of a loosely drawn grid. Each image existed independently of the others, yet their arrangement on the same plane, along with relationships of color, texture and shape, allow the viewer to free-associate to them. Meaning, then, is intensely personal – another innovation of Gottlieb's pictograph paintings based on Surrealist biomorphism. For Gottlieb, biomorphism was a way to freely express his unconscious mind, in which he had become fascinated via John Graham, Sigmund Freud and Surrealism. Gottlieb also incorporated automatism – the painterly technique for Freudian free-association – was the method Gottlieb used to generate biomorphic shapes, inspired by forms which had spontaneously emerged from his unconscious mind. . These biomorphic shapes were separated by the all over grid pattern, which served as the overall structure of the "pictograph" series.

Gottlieb once said, "If I made a wriggly line or a serpentine line it was because I wanted a serpentine line. Afterwards it would suggest a snake but when I made it, it did not suggest anything. It was purely shape... ". These lines and shapes that Gottlieb used were easily interpreted to mean different things by different people. By 1950 Gottlieb observed that the "all-over painting" approach had become a cliché for American abstract painting. He began his new series of Imaginary Landscapes in which he retained his usage of a 'pseudo-language' but added the new element of space. He was not painting landscapes in the traditional sense, rather he modified that genre to match his own style of painting. Imaginary Landscapes are horizontal canvasses divided into two registers, one very active below a more contemplative upper one, set up a different approach to abstraction at mid-century. In 1955 Gottlieb remarked: I frequently hear the question, "What do these images mean?" This is simply the wrong question. Visual images do not have to conform to either verbal thinking or optical facts. A better question would be "Do these images convey any emotional truth?"

Late in 1956 Gottlieb formulated the image that has become known as the "Burst" and spent most of the next two years working on this approach. He simplifies his representation down to two disc shapes and winding masses. His paintings are variations with these elements arranged in different ways. This series, unlike the Imaginary Landscape series, suggests a basic landscape with a sun and a ground. On another level, the shapes are so rudimentary; they are not limited to this one interpretation.

He was a masterful colorist as well and in the Burst series his use of color is particularly crucial. He is considered one of the first color field painters and is one of the forerunners of Lyrical Abstraction.

== 1960s–1970s ==
By 1960, Gottlieb's efforts on his "Burst" series, allowed him to greatly simplify his use of imagery. He created "Burst" and "Imaginary Landscape" type paintings for the remainder of his career but, unlike some of his colleagues, he did not limit himself to one or two images.Discussion of Gottlieb's art is usually limited to mentions of "Bursts" or "Imaginary Landscapes", which detracts from the broad range of ideas this artist examined. Gottlieb summarized his aims in a 1967 interview:

But to me everything is nature, including any feelings that I have – or dreams. Everything is part of nature. Even painting has become part of nature. To clarify further: I don't have an ideological approach or a doctrinaire approach to my work. I just paint from my personal feelings, and my reflexes and instincts. I have to trust these.

A representative painting from this period is included in The Governor Nelson A. Rockefeller Empire State Plaza Art Collection in Albany, NY.

In 1967, while Gottlieb was preparing for the Whitney and Guggenheim Museum exhibition he began to make small models for sculptures out of cut and painted cardboard that, he said, made him feel like "a young sculptor, just beginning". These small sculptures evolved into larger works in cut, welded and painted steel and aluminum. His foray into sculpture lasted only about a year and a half, but in that brief time he created a body of work that challenged the delineation between painting and sculpture. In ways similar to his friend the sculptor David Smith, Gottlieb's background as a painter made it impossible for him to visualize objects without color. Once he accepted this, He was compelled to use all the tools he had developed in his long painting career – touch, visual balance, surface quality and more – to make his sculptures, like his paintings, become "a vehicle for the expression of feeling… I feel a necessity for making the particular colors that I use, or the particular shapes, carry the burden of everything that I want to express, and all has to be concentrated within these few elements." In all Gottlieb created 42 sculptures, including three large, outdoor pieces that are currently in the collections of The National Gallery of Art in Washington, DC, The Storm King Art Center in New Windsor, NY, and the Metropolitan Museum of Art in New York City.

Gottlieb remained active throughout the 1960s. In 1963 he became the first American artist to be awarded the Gran Premio of the São Paulo Bienal in Brazil. In 1968, the Guggenheim Museum and the Whitney Museum in New York collaborated on a retrospective exhibition of his art that filled both museums. This remains, to date, the only collaborative project between these two major institutions.

== Career highlights ==
Gottlieb had 56 solo exhibitions and was included in over 200 group exhibitions. His works of art are in the collections of more than 140 major museums around the world. Gottlieb was accomplished as a painter, draughtsman, printmaker and sculptor. He designed and oversaw construction of a 1500 square-foot stained glass façade for the Milton Steinberg Center in New York City in 1954, and he designed a suite of 18 stained glass windows for the Kingsway Jewish Center in Brooklyn. He was the first of his generation to have his art collected by the Museum of Modern Art, New York (1946) and the Guggenheim Museum (1948).

In 1950–51, Gottlieb designed a curtain for the Torah ark at Congregation B'nai Israel in Millburn, New Jersey. Executed by women of the congregation under Esther Gottlieb's supervision, it adapted his pictograph style to symbols including the Tablets of the Law, the Twelve Tribes, the Temple and the Ark of the Covenant.

Gottlieb's work is included in the permanent holdings of numerous museum institutions in the US, for instance, his work Altar from 1947, is included in the permanent collections of the Pérez Art Museum Miami, Florida.

== Death and legacy ==
A stroke in 1970 left Gottlieb paralyzed except for his right arm and hand. He continued to paint and to exhibit his art until his death in March 1974. His funeral service was held on March 6, 1974, at Frank E. Campbell Funeral Home, and he was buried at Mt. Pleasant Cemetery, Hawthorne, NY. He was voted into the American Academy of Arts and Letters in 1972.

Gottlieb advocated for artists' professional status throughout his life. He helped to organize "Forum 49” and other artist-led events and symposia in New York and Provincetown in the 1940s and 1950s. In 1950, he was the primary organizer of the protest against the Metropolitan Museum of Art that resulted in him and his colleagues gaining recognition as "The Irascibles". Following directions in his Will, the Adolph and Esther Gottlieb Foundation was formed in 1976, offering grants to visual artists.

== Sources ==
- Marika Herskovic, American Abstract Expressionism of the 1950s An Illustrated Survey, (New York School Press, 2003.) ISBN 0-9677994-1-4. pp. 142–145
- Marika Herskovic, New York School Abstract Expressionists Artists Choice by Artists, (New York School Press, 2000.) ISBN 0-9677994-0-6. p. 32; p. 37; pp. 158–161
- ART USA NOW Ed. by Lee Nordness; Vol. 1, (The Viking Press, Inc., 1963.), pp. 118–121.
