= Makers of the City =

1990 book by Lewis F. Fried

- Author: Lewis F. Fried
- Subject: City planning
- Publisher: University of Massachusetts Press
- Publication date: 1990
- Pages: 244

Makers of the City is a 1990 book of essays by Lewis F. Fried about four writers who wrote about the American city: Jacob Riis, Lewis Mumford, James T. Farrell, and Paul Goodman.
