= Communitas (book) =

1947 book by Percival and Paul Goodman

- First edition
- Author: Percival Goodman, Paul Goodman
- Subject: Urban planning
- Publisher: University of Chicago Press
- Publication date: 1947
- Pages: 141
- OCLC: 710701

Communitas: Means of Livelihood and Ways of Life is a 1947 book on community and city planning by Percival and Paul Goodman. Presented as an illustrated primer on how city planning affects socioeconomic order and citizens' empowerment to better their communities, the book reviews historical and modern approaches to urban planning before proposing three of the Goodmans' own provocative community paradigms.

The brothers worked on Communitas through the early 1940s based on an unsuccessful 1939 World's Fair proposal. The University of Chicago-published book was not well known until it was revised and re-released alongside Paul Goodman's Growing Up Absurd in a 1960 edition by Vintage Books. Communitas became known as a major work of urban planning and influenced historical, anthropological, and educational activists.

== Contents ==
Communitas: Means of Livelihood and Ways of Life argues for "human scale" urban planning, in which buildings, cities, economics, and society are made to suit immediate community needs. It is presented as an illustrated primer on how city planning effects socioeconomic order and citizen empowerment to better their communities. The book's first half addresses historical and modern approaches to urban planning, while the second half introduces the authors' own urban proposals.

The authors begin by evaluating three existing approaches to modern urbanism, each in brief: self-contained garden cities, production-focused industrialized plans, and rural–urban integrated plans. Their introduction to garden cities covers the works of Patrick Geddes, Ebenezer Howard, and Raymond Unwin. Their survey of urban production includes the American mill town, Chinese and Soviet industrial plans, and Buckminster Fuller's utopian project. While lukewarm on industrial projects of both American private capitalist and Soviet state capitalist societies, they criticize Fuller's focus on technology. Lastly, the authors overview humane combinations of rural and urban life (i.e., integrated plans) such as Borsodian homesteads, kibbutzim, progressive schools, the Tennessee Valley Authority, and works of Frank Lloyd Wright. They also write on the integration of work and life, agriculture and manufacturing, and communal and regional development. While the authors lament a perceived loss of collective American spirit, they compare communal experiments to the artistic vanguards in that many are unsuccessful but influential in pollinating subsequent efforts. The Goodmans advocate for city squares designed to support rich human interactions. They criticize American obsession with large, industrial buildings and, in the International Style of Le Corbusier, a lack of humane aesthetic.

The second half of Communitas presents three of the Goodmans' own community paradigms. Each represents a specific set of socioeconomic values expressed through its community's design. None are meant to be complete, mutually exclusive plans, but rather experimental alternatives upon which a community could deliberate. The Goodmans follow a planning philosophy they call "neofunctionalism". Whereas functionalism provides the appropriate architecture to achieve a specific purpose, the Goodmans' neofunctionalism critically assesses what way of life the plan supports; for example, the extent to which the plan's resulting standard of living contributes to its inhabitants' life satisfaction. Their three plans suggest potential for societal reorganization rather than just amelioration of social conditions.

"The City of Efficient Consumption", their first program, imagines the city as a department store as a satire for the contemporary American consumer society. Made to minimize barriers to buying and selling, the program's society and politics are made to mimic the frenetic culture of advertising. The compulsive consumption program ends with a ritual potlatch festival to clear out old goods and begin another consumption cycle.

The second program, "The New Commune", is an integrated community with libertarian (anarchist) values of liberating work, industrial democracy, and aesthetics. In these self-sufficient integrated communities, expert workers collectively drive industry and redesign both work and domestic life with psychological, moral, and technical considerations. The communities co-exist in a decentralized federalism.

“The Standard of Minimum Subsistence”, the third program, is a dual economy in which a subsistence economy provides for a minimum standard of basic needs (food, housing, services, worthwhile work) for all, within a larger, affluent, market economy in which private enterprise provides luxuries and productive/consumptive activity. Figuring that these basic needs could be freely provided for the nation with only a fraction of its total economic output, the Goodmans propose a tithe in which citizens each serve the subsistence economy for seven years in exchange for lifelong subsistence and economic freedom.

They also briefly mention a fourth approach to the surplus economy: endless war production—the likely scenario in which the economy continues to expand for its own sake. Appendices include four shorter works by the authors on New York urban planning, including a republication of “Master Plan for New York” (first published in The New Republic) and a plan for a blighted New York area (from Architectural Forum).

== Publication ==
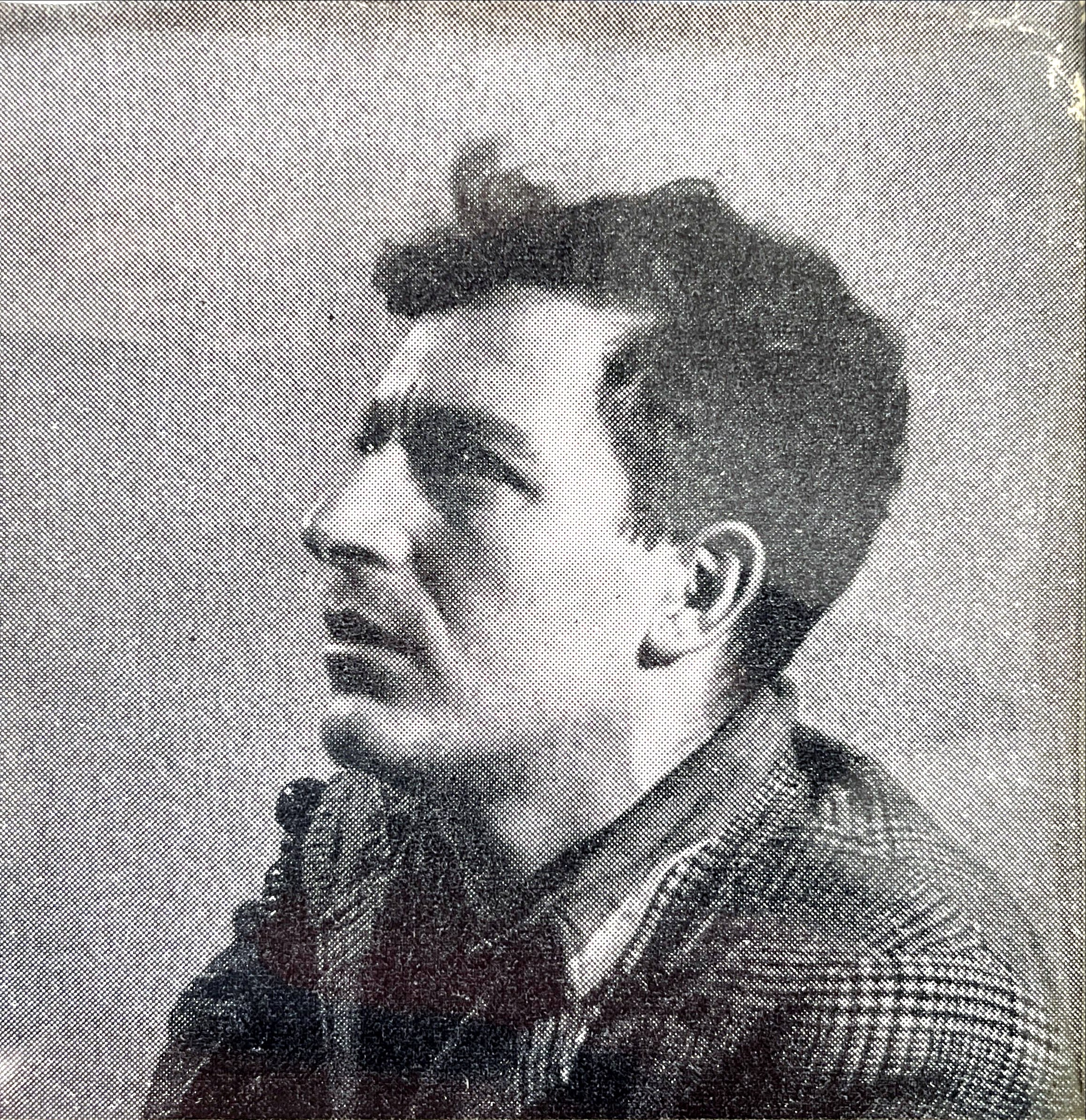
Paul Goodman during the late 1940s

The brothers Percival (Percy) and Paul Goodman, an architect and a humanist, respectively, co-authored Communitas. The idea developed from Percy's exhibition concept for a "city of tomorrow", which he had unsuccessfully proposed for Otis Elevator at the 1939 World's Fair. As was customary for Paul's collaboration style, he rewrote the concept as a satirical pastiche of consumerism. Secure in his own career and proud of his brother's analytic imagination, Percy did not take offense and the pair worked together without rivalry. Paul wrote the book in his theoretical style, suggestive and practical in tone rather than definitive or normative. Percy provided the book's illustrations.

Communitas was first written in the early 1940s, and edited in 1946 for publication the next year. The University of Chicago Press published 2,000 cloth cover copies on April 21, 1947. Vintage Books (a Random House imprint) released a revised second edition in August 1960 alongside Paul Goodman's landmark Growing Up Absurd. The revised Communitas rearranges the book's contents and tightens some passages, including the conclusion. The Goodmans added some examples (such as a Chinese commune and Black Mountain College) and updated others (e.g., highway materials). Though the revised edition puts more emphasis on the role of "affluence", the book remained mostly the same. Altogether, Vintage printed 117,000 paperback copies between 1960 and 1974. Communitas received translations into Spanish (1964), Japanese (late 1960s), and Italian (1970).

== Reception ==
For a book that would become well-known, Communitas generally did not generate much published commentary. Among the main critiques was sociologist David Riesman, who later wrote The Lonely Crowd. The sociologist notes issues with the Goodmans' sparse treatment of history and comments on the book's intellectual forebears, with a particular focus on its dependence on scholar of cities Lewis Mumford and perceived unfairness towards garden city movement founder Ebenezer Howard.

Communitas was markedly unlike most other books on physical city planning. Reviewers described its style and unorthodox proposals as brave, daring, startling, and provocative. Mumford described the brothers as bringing a "fresh method ... which has as yet few exponents", existing in its own class as a wholly original approach to city planning between its wit, provocations, and emphasis on the moral underpinnings for planning. Throughout Communitas, historians Theodore Roszak and Talbot Hamlin saw the spirit of artistry, from the wit and bite of the authors' words to its interwoven illustrations, as city planning from the perspective of a novelist. From page to page, housing expert Charles Abrams found himself manically oscillating between agreement and disgust. The oblong book itself is also unordinary in presentation. Reviewers variously found Percival's illustrations to be an attractive supplement, part blueprint, comic strip, and William Blake, while another considered the illustrations bizarrely unrelated to their subject matter. "Frankly", wrote The Nation, "the book is a circus."

Others commented on the book's unclear language and jargon. Whereas Communitas sought to integrate social and planning perspectives, housing expert Charles Abrams and the American Society of Planning Officials newsletter instead saw the Goodmans as haphazardly mixing their disciplines. Reviewers mentioned jargon-laden, rambling, unclear writing with heavy, "closed-packed" sentences. Though writer and intellectual Dwight Macdonald admired Communitas, he criticized Goodman's prose for being “fuzzy” in a manner unlike the author's thoughts. To Abrams, the authors wrote with high disdain for their readers.

Throughout Communitas, the authors, as New Yorkers, are dismissive of cultures unlike the megacity's, potentially conflating historical precedent with the natural effects of environmental design.

== Legacy ==
Following the resurgence of interest in Paul Goodman's works late in his life, Communitas became known as a major work of urban planning, sometimes considered Goodman's masterpiece. After becoming an influential essay in the 1960s, it remained regarded as a classic text of city planning into the 21st century.

Three decades from its publication, despite some details growing outdated, literary critic Kingsley Widmer considered the book's "imaginative sociology" approach to utopian social thinking and urban planning—combining real social problems with speculative moral philosophy—to have continued relevance. Widmer likened Communitas to "libertarian footnotes on Plato's Republic" and considered it Paul Goodman's best book, worthy of inclusion in a compilation of Goodman's best works.

The book was among the foremost influences of American historian Gar Alperovitz and was British anarchist Colin Ward's favorite work from Goodman's oeuvre. The "communitas" concept in Victor Turner's anthropology of ritual borrowed from the Goodmans, as did some communal experiments of the 1960s, including progressive schools, free universities, and living–working communes. Gate Hill Cooperative, an intentional community in upstate New York, was influenced by the Goodmans' Communitas.

Percival Goodman, who became an architect of some renown, later released The Double E (1977) as a sequel to Communitas, following his brother's death.
