= Paul Goodman bibliography =

- Books↙: 18
- Novels↙: 3
- Stories↙: 4 collections
- Poems↙: 4 collections
- Plays↙: 10

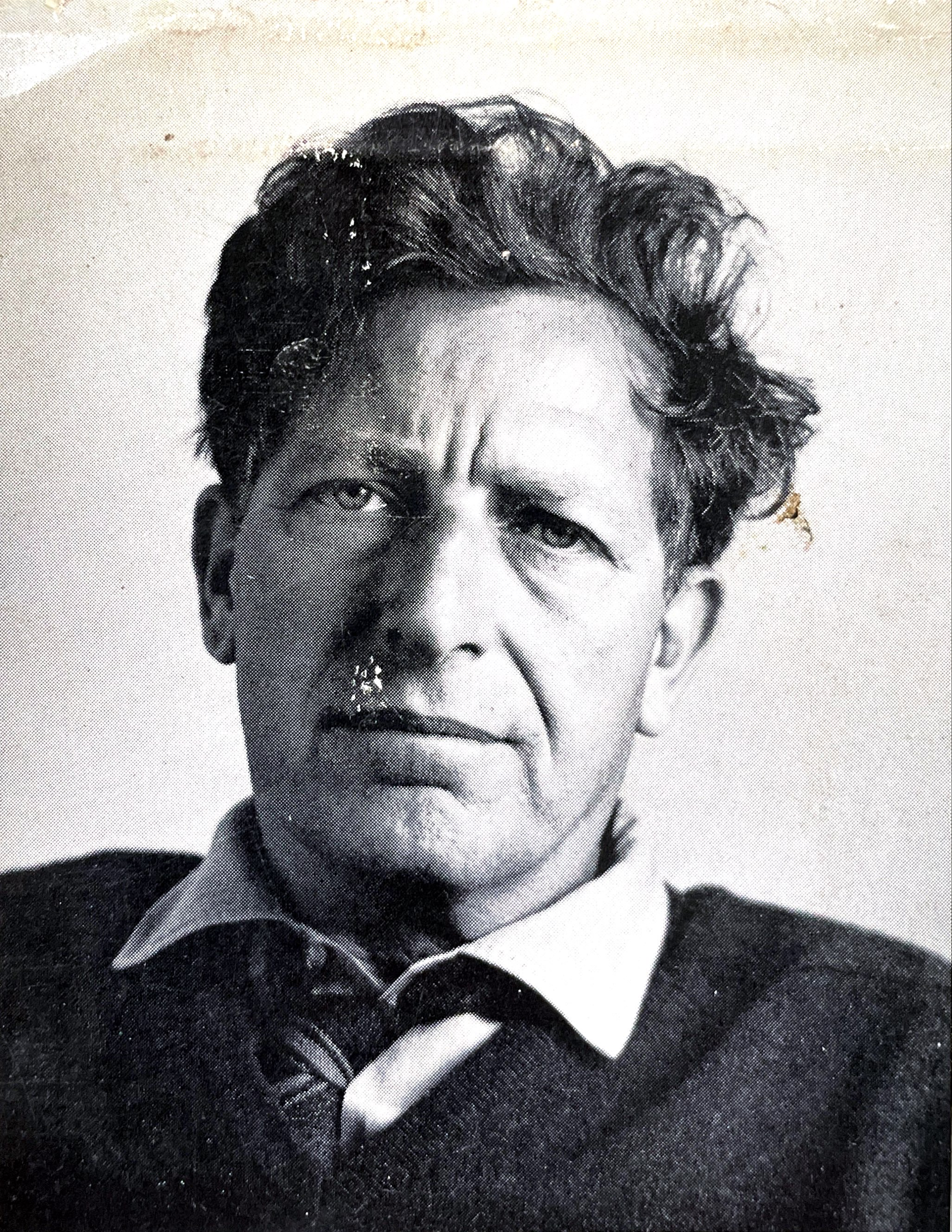
Goodman, c. 1969

This is a list of works by Paul Goodman (1911–1972), including his nonfiction, novels, short stories, poetry, and plays.

== Nonfiction ==
=== Books ===
- Kafka's Prayer (1947)
- Communitas (1947, with Percival Goodman)
- Gestalt Therapy (1951, with Fritz Perls and Ralph Hefferline)
- The Structure of Literature (1954)
- Growing Up Absurd (1960)
- Utopian Essays and Practical Proposals (1962)
- The Community of Scholars (1962)
- Compulsory Miseducation (1964)
- People or Personnel (1965)
- Five Years (1966)
- Like a Conquered Province (1967)
- New Reformation (1970)
- Speaking and Language (1971)
- Little Prayers and Finite Experience (1972)
- Creator Spirit Come! The Literary Essays of Paul Goodman (1977)
- Drawing the Line: The Political Essays of Paul Goodman (1977)
- Nature Heals: The Psychological Essays of Paul Goodman (1977)
- Crazy Hope and Finite Experience: Final Essays of Paul Goodman (1994)

== Fiction ==
=== Long fiction ===
- The Empire City (1959)
  - The Grand Piano: Or, The Almanac of Alienation (1942)
  - The State of Nature (1946)
  - The Dead of Spring (1950)
  - The Holy Terror (1959)
- Parents' Day (1951)
- Making Do (1963)

=== Short fiction ===
- The Facts of Life (1945)
- The Break-up of Our Camp, and Other Stories (1949)
- Our Visit to Niagara (1960)
- Adam and His Works (1968)
- The Collected Stories and Sketches of Paul Goodman (1977–1980, four volumes)

=== Plays ===
- Jonah (1945)
- Faustina (1949)
- Childish Jokes: Crying Backstage (1951)
- The Young Disciple (1955)
- Tragedy and Comedy: Four Cubist Plays (1970)

=== Poetry ===
- Stop-light: Five Dance Poems (1941)
- The Lordly Hudson: Collected Poems (1962)
- Hawkweed (1967)
- Homespun of Oatmeal Gray (1970)
- Collected Poems (1973)

== Sources ==
- Borklund, Elmer (1977). "Paul Goodman". Contemporary Literary Critics. Contemporary Writers of the English Language. New York: St. Martin's Press. pp. 226–231. ISBN 978-0-333-22667-4.
- Nicely, Tom (1979). Adam and His Work: A Bibliography of Sources by and about Paul Goodman (1911–1972). Metuchen, N.J.: Scarecrow Press. ISBN 978-0-8108-1219-2. OCLC 4832535.
- — (1986). "Adam and His Work: A Bibliographical Update". In Parisi, Peter (ed.). Artist of the Actual: Essays on Paul Goodman. Metuchen, N.J.: Scarecrow Press. pp. 153–183. ISBN 978-0-8108-1843-9. OCLC 12418868.
- Sulkes, Stan (2010). "Paul Goodman". Critical Survey of Long Fiction (4th ed.). Salem Press. pp. 1892–1900. ISBN 978-1-58765-535-7.
- Wilson, Robert A. (November 1979). "Review of Adam and His Work: A Bibliography of Sources by and About Paul Goodman (1911–1972) by Tom Nicely". Book Collector's Market: 39–40. ISSN 0162-2498. ProQuest 2152461428.
