= The Society I Live in Is Mine =

1963 book by Paul Goodman

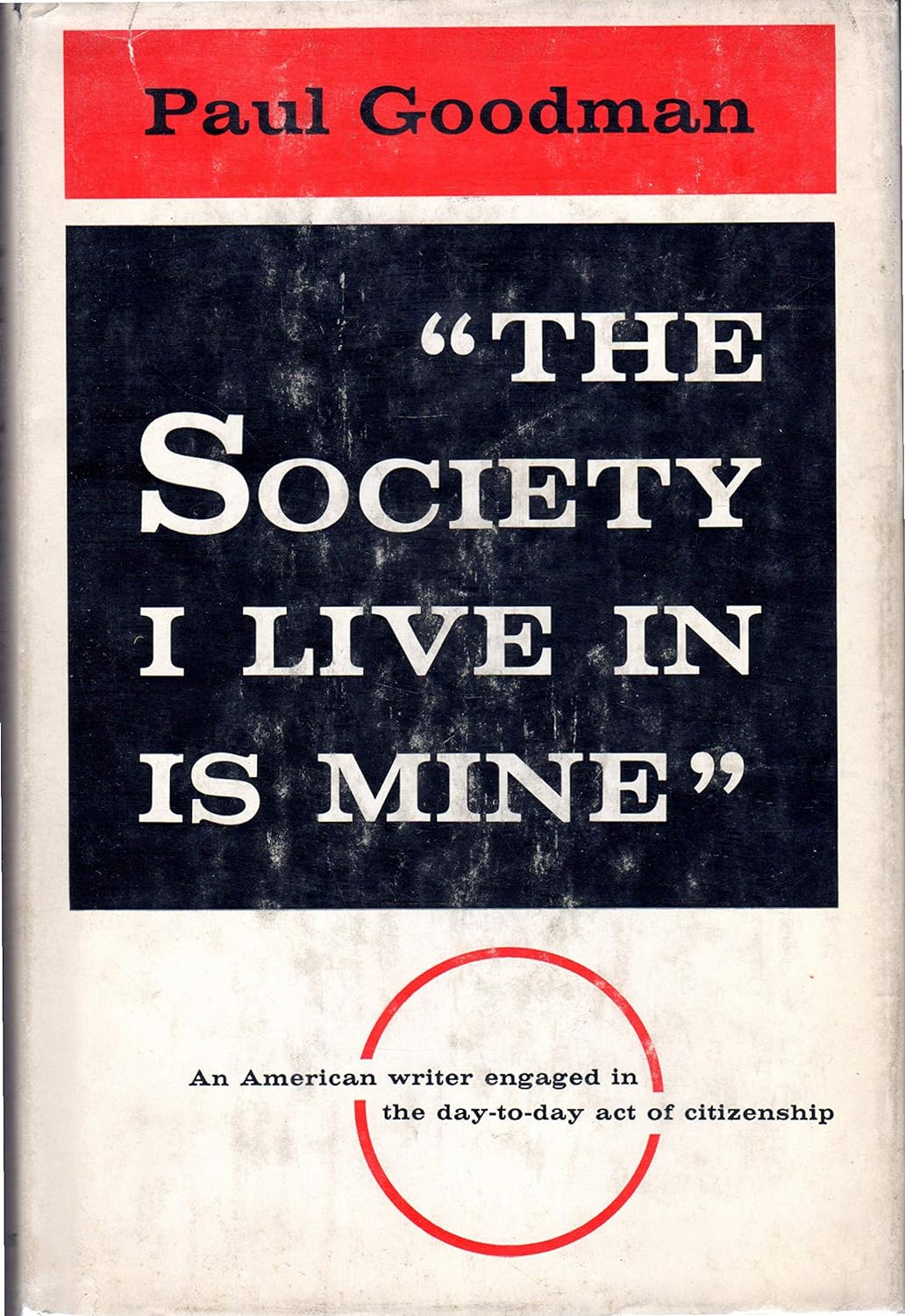
- Author: Paul Goodman
- Subject: Social commentary
- Publisher: Horizon Press
- Publication date: April 4, 1963
- Pages: 180
- OCLC: 419522

The Society I Live in Is Mine is a 1963 book of Paul Goodman's social commentary ephemera. In a collection of letters to the editor, essays, speeches, reviews, and other clippings, Goodman addresses the general public on a range of civic problems. His aim is to influence their thinking and to model the type of alert and intervening citizen he believes is necessary for societal change. His proposals span from urban renewal to school administration, with a particular focus on education and youth. They reflect his community anarchist position, which advocates for individual initiative, opposes sovereignty, and experiments with social alternatives.

Goodman corresponded with various officials and New York publications and includes his commentary on these letters, indicating whether they were printed. He also includes several book reviews and reprinted essays from Dissent and Liberation magazines. Horizon Press published the book. Critics responded favorably to Goodman's approach to civics but disagreed on whether his method was egotistical or entertaining.

== Contents and themes ==
"The society in which I live is mine, open to my voice and action, or I do not live there at all. The government, the school board, the church, the university, the world of publishing and communications, are my agencies as a citizen. To the extent that they are not my agencies, at least open to my voice and action, I am entirely in revolutionary opposition to them and I think they should be wiped off the slate."

— Paul Goodman

The Society I Live in Is Mine is a collection of social commentary ephemera by Paul Goodman, including both published and unpublished letters to the editor, essays, and speeches from newspapers and magazines. Much of the content addresses the general public with the intention of urging readers to become more alert and intervening citizens, using his own actions as an example. Goodman describes the collection as "angry letters on public morals and politics" written to "influence the general consensus". He expresses dismay that so few people consider themselves citizens, instead viewing society as a machinery of authorities in which they merely participate. Goodman intends to demonstrate that by making their voices heard, people can more fully participate in and enjoy their society. He posits that a multitude of authentic, concerned citizens is the solution for a society dulled by standardization, neglect, and injustice.

The book includes many letters to publications and public officials, as well as some speeches and reviews. Goodman considered "occasional letters" such as these to be the sharpest articulation of an author's style and thought. He wrote to a range of New York publications, including public newspapers, alt weeklies, academic faculty and student publications, and counter-cultural periodicals. His public letters tend to address larger societal problems, such as: advertising at a university, the issue of good teachers blamed for bad administrative decisions (addressed to the New York State Commissioner of Education), and citizen demonstrations (addressed to the United Nations Secretary General). The text also includes notes disclosing instances where his recipients did not print or acknowledge his letters, indicating that his proposals were not always well-received. The book includes commentary on the general effect of the letters. When his letters went unpublished, Goodman attributed it to the editor's judgment or courage.

His reviews include republications of commentary on books by James Baldwin (Another Country), (Note: The Nashville Banner described Goodman's Baldwin review as "famous".) James B. Conant (Slums and Suburbs), Benjamin Spock (Problems of Parents), Maurice R. Stein (The Eclipse of Community), Vincent Riccio and Bill Slocum (All the Way Down: The Violent Underworld of Street Gangs), and Robert Penn Warren (Segregation: The Inner Conflict in the South). Goodman's reprinted essays from Dissent and Liberation include "Reflections on Literature as a Minor Art", "A Tour of South Africa", and "Format and Anxiety".

The range of topics covered in his correspondence lacks strict categorization but reflects the breadth of civic problems that interested him. Goodman's general position is that of a "community anarchist": he believes in reducing supreme power (sovereignty), increasing individual initiative, and experimenting in topics such as education and disarmament. Although he writes mostly from a liberal perspective, Goodman makes some arch-conservative points in the name of diminishing sovereignty, notably his opposition to nation-states and his support for "personal liberty and local initiative". As one reviewer noted, the collection's only unifying theme is "the mind of Paul Goodman", reflecting his positions as an anarchist and pacifist, and his advocacy for sexual freedom, libertarian education, and face-to-face communication in small communities. His positions include: abolishing suburbs, abolishing advertising, rallying civil disobedience and peace marches in response to war, dividing cities into village neighborhoods, offering informal apprenticeships for adolescents, encouraging sex, reducing school administration, and experimenting with small classes and amateur teachers. (Note: These positions recur in his proposals as a member of Manhattan local school boards in the early 1960s.)

He focuses particularly on education and what he calls "the waste of the young". Goodman advocates for greater teacher and student liberties, despite his era's opposition to progressive schooling. He argues against school standardization as a path to student achievement and believes that American society will become wiser and more capable of distributing authority to explore personal initiative and make mistakes. He argues against minimizing dropouts in institutions like schools, preferring to provide them with alternative ways to live decently. Goodman argues against literacy, which he believes has "no practical importance" in societal decision-making and is mainly used for advertising and campaigning.

== Publication ==
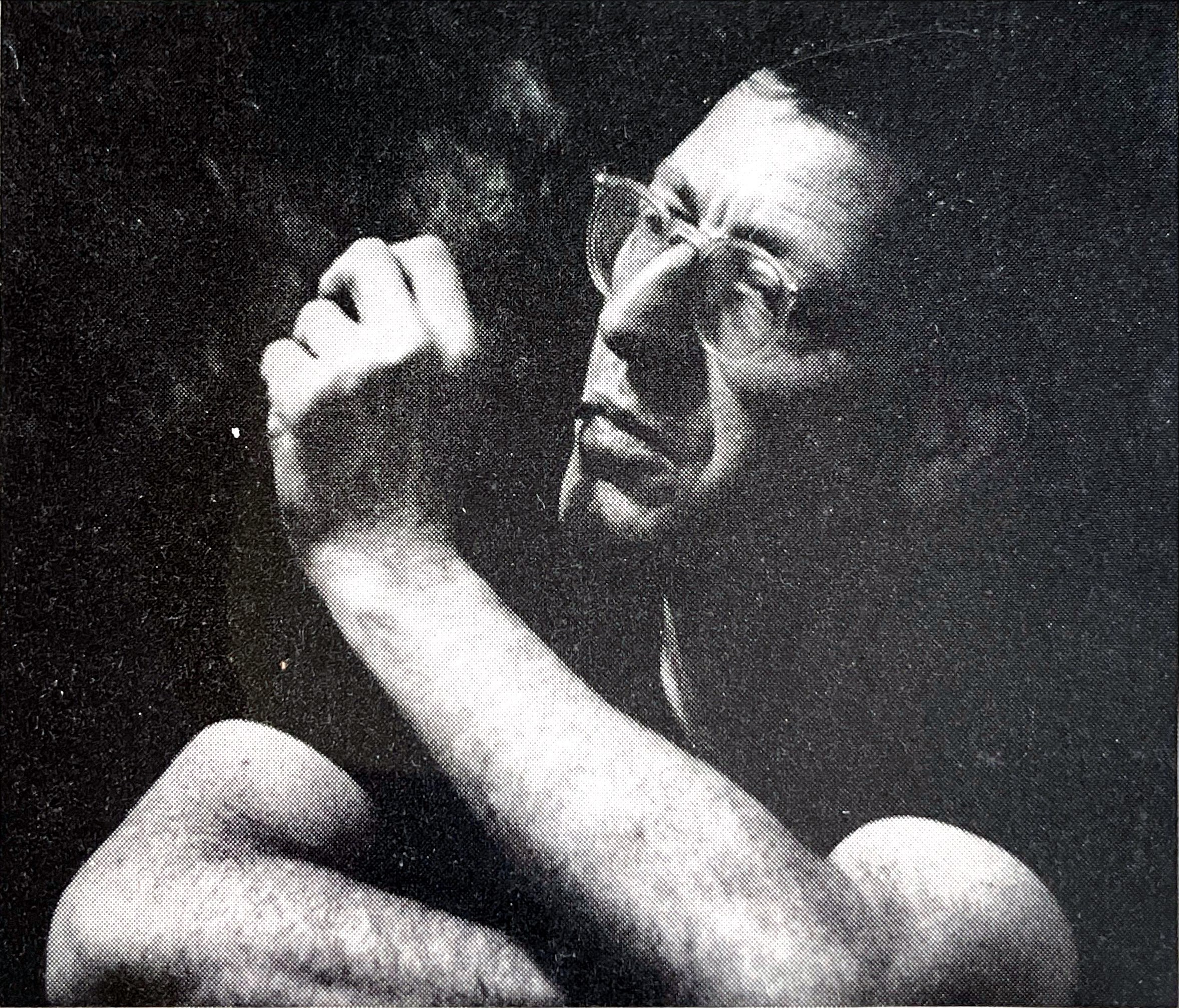
The author, around the time of publication

Horizon Press published the book in hardcover on April 4, 1963. The press was known for publishing early books by unknown authors and unknown books by familiar authors. Horizon had published Goodman's earlier short story collection Our Visit to Niagara (1960) and would also publish his Compulsory Mis-education the next year (1964). By the time of the book's publication, Goodman's social criticism already had a considerable following among American youth.

== Reception and legacy ==
Reviewers commented on Goodman's role as a social gadfly: "strident, denunciatory, sometimes simplistic" but "always earnest" and not easily categorized. Raymond Price Jr. and August Derleth were encouraged by Goodman’s articulate opinions, his view of civics as a “right and responsibility” to act in one’s own society, and his willingness to participate in the affairs of others. Santa Maria Times wrote that Goodman's appeal for more public letter-writing made more sense for Goodman himself than for the general public, who lacked his panache. Critics differed on whether Goodman’s chiding approach was benevolent: While Nat Hentoff found this technique stimulating, The San Francisco Examiner viewed it as crankiness and Price as intellectual vanity. Price described the book as an "exercise in ego fulfillment" in which Goodman postures extravagantly, dismisses his detractors, and stifles debate, wearing down the reader. Hentoff, however, felt that Goodman’s hectoring insistence is what made him one of American society’s most thoroughly independent minds.

The Washington Evening Star wrote that thinkers like Goodman who break out of traditional patterns of thought are "destined to perpetrate one outrage after another". The critic found Goodman's positions to be sensible yet extreme, such that he could appreciate the proposals but struggled to fully agree. Hentoff considered Goodman's solutions debatable or impossible, requiring "a prior social revolution that he does not know how to instigate".

Price considered the book to be unfocused as a collection of ephemera and did not think Goodman's old letters merited republication, suggesting that The Society I Live in Is Mine would best appeal to those already fond of Goodman's style. Similarly, the Santa Maria Times did not believe Goodman’s letters would stand the test of time, like those of Thomas Babington Macaulay or Benjamin Franklin, though Goodman's book of letters to editors was itself a rare concept and interesting experiment. For Hentoff, the book was most valuable for its distillation of Goodman's central ideas, but it also served as entertainment, allowing readers to witness Goodman's "indignant, sardonic, and often devastatingly accurate assaults," such as his commentary on cultural absurdities like a preschool television program lacking the spontaneity of childhood, or a school of science running a shelter drill that provided no actual shelter to children in the event of a bombing. The New Yorker concurred that Goodman was funnier than he realized. Hentoff noted that Goodman is readable because all his years of fervent opposition have not made him "chronically self-righteous or humorless".

== Bibliography ==
- Derleth, August (August 8, 1963). "Books of the Times (Revs. of The Society I Live in Is Mine and The Lordly Hudson)". The Capital Times. Madison, Wisconsin. p. 26. ISSN 0749-4068. Archived from the original on August 22, 2024.
- Hentoff, Nat (July 18, 1963). "A Village Anarchist (Rev. of The Society I Live in Is Mine by Paul Goodman)". The Reporter. 29 (2). New York: 54–55. ISSN 1049-1600.
- Hogan, William (May 18, 1963). "The Letter Writer as a Society-Maker (Rev. of The Society I Live in Is Mine)". Santa Maria Times. Santa Maria, California. p. 31. ISSN 0745-6166. Archived from the original on February 25, 2023. Also published in "Letters of an Angry Man (Rev. of The Society I Live in Is Mine)". Victoria Advocate. Victoria, Texas. May 26, 1963. p. 28. OCLC 13698588. Archived from the original on February 25, 2023.
- Mintz, Donald (May 24, 1963). "A Book for Today (Rev. of The Society I Live in Is Mine)". Evening Star. Washington, District of Columbia. p. 14. ISSN 2331-9968.
- Nicely, Tom (1979). Adam and His Work: A Bibliography of Sources by and about Paul Goodman (1911–1972). Metuchen, N.J.: Scarecrow Press. ISBN 978-0-8108-1219-2.
- Pearre, Howell (December 27, 1963). "Essays Cover Variety of Topics". Nashville Banner. Nashville, Tennessee. p. 18. OCLC 9426483. Archived from the original on February 25, 2023.
- Price, Raymond Jr. (May 26, 1963). "On a Soapbox, Proud and Erratic (Rev. of The Society I Live in Is Mine by Paul Goodman)". New York Herald Tribune Books. 39 (27). New York: 11. ISSN 1941-0646.
- "Rev. of The Society I Live in Is Mine by Paul Goodman". The New Yorker. Vol. 39, no. 20. New York. July 6, 1963. p. 74. ISSN 0028-792X.
- Stanley, Donald (April 30, 1963). "Goodman's Anger (Rev. of The Society I Live in Is Mine)". The San Francisco Examiner. San Francisco. p. 29. ISSN 2574-593X. Archived from the original on August 22, 2024.
- Widmer, Kingsley (1980). Paul Goodman. Boston: Twayne. ISBN 0-8057-7292-8.
