= Poetry of Paul Goodman =

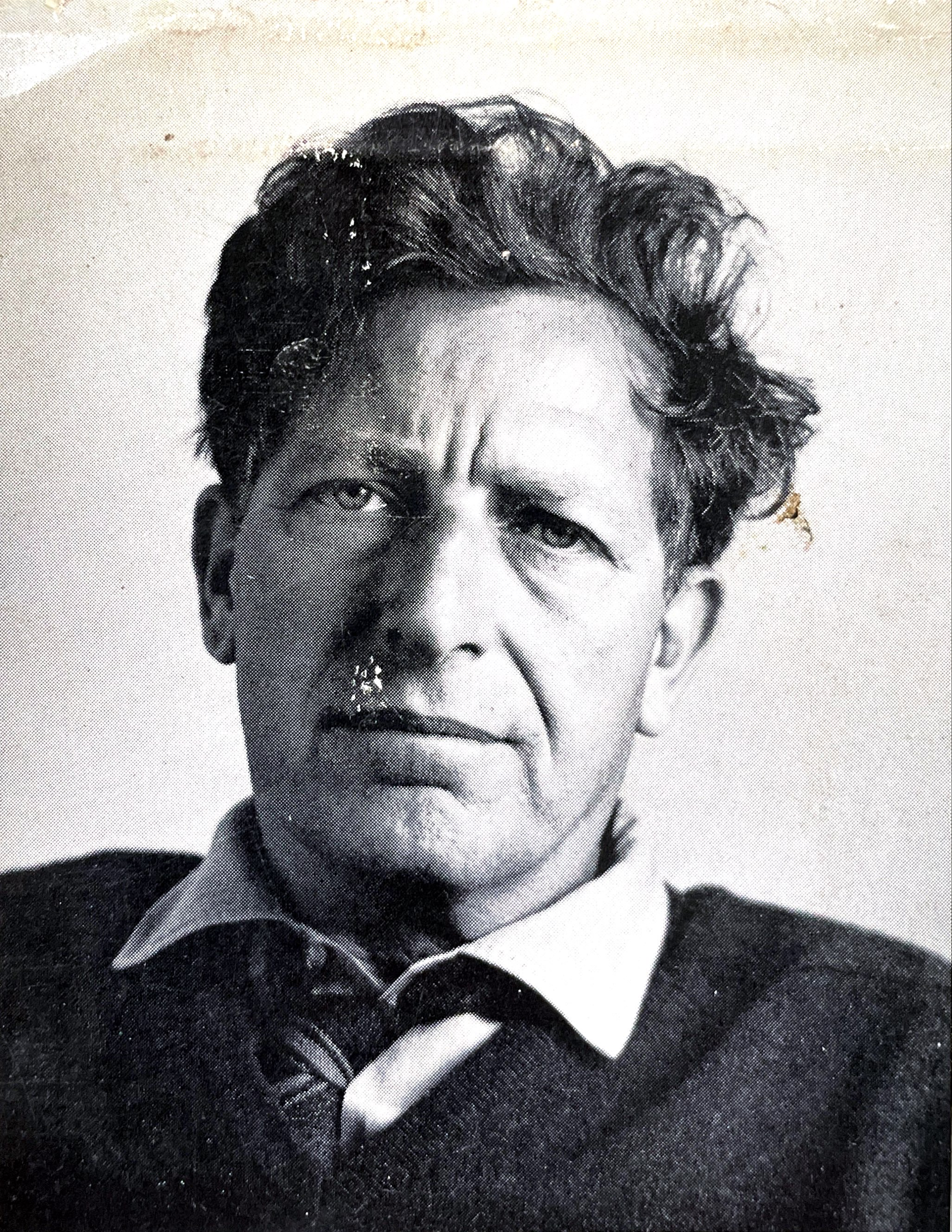
Goodman

Paul Goodman described himself as a man of letters but foremost a poet. He published several poetry collections in his life, including The Lordly Hudson (1962), Hawkweed (1967), North Percy (1968), and Homespun of Oatmeal Gray (1970). His Collected Poems (1973) were published posthumously.

== Background ==
Paul Goodman (1911–1972) referred to himself, based on his various literary interests, as a man of letters. While prolific across many literary forms and topical categories, (Note: At the time of his death, his work spanned 21 different sections of the New York Public Library.) as a humanist, Goodman thought of his writing as serving one common subject—"the organism and the environment"—and one common, pragmatic aim: that the writing should effect a change. Indeed, Goodman's poetry, fiction, drama, literary criticism, urban planning, psychological, cultural, and educational theory addressed the theme of the individual citizen's duties in the larger society, especially the responsibility to exercise free action and creativity. While his fiction and poetry was noted in his time, following Growing Up Absurd's success, he diverted his attention from literature and spent his final decade pursuing the social and cultural criticism that forms the basis of his legacy.

Goodman prized his poems and stories above his other work, and thought of himself as foremost a poet, though it would not be the work for which he was known.

== Practice and style ==
Goodman began to write poems in his youth, before his first stories. He modeled his early poems in the tradition of Greek and Latin poets, rather than the more contemporary of modernist poetry.

He was known to compose his poems on paper scraps and envelopes that he carried.

Goodman tends to write in traditional formats, albeit loosely, and about his very personal, direct experience, often describing "his" city and circumstances in a style "closer to heightened speech than modernist ellipses".

== Publication history ==
His poems were printed in little magazines and limited private editions. New Directions featured Goodman in their 1941 Five Young American Poets. Goodman released five verse poems the same year in Stop-Light, written in the style of Japanese Noh.

Goodman originally printed a set of poems, The Copernican Revolution, as a Christmas card with his friend's small 5x8 Press in 1946. With demand, a 1947 edition doubled its content.

Between 1954 and 1960, Goodman's spouse, Sally Goodman, compiled and printed three pamphlets of his poetry: Day and Other Poems (1954), Red Jacket (Christmas 1955), and The Well of Bethlehem (1957 or 1958). Some of these poems were previously published in the Quarterly Review of Literature, Poetry, Resistance, among other small publications.

His poetry collections came later in his life, after he had come to prominence as a social critic with Growing Up Absurd (1960). These poetry volumes included The Lordly Hudson (1962), Hawkweed (1967), North Percy (1968), and Homespun of Oatmeal Grey (1970).

== Collections ==
=== The Lordly Hudson ===
Poet Harvey Shapiro wrote that the poetry in The Lordly Hudson, Goodman's first solo collection, was "the purest version of his thought ... always serviceable, sometimes awkward ... by rips and starts brilliant." Richard Kostelanetz wrote that Goodman's title lyric was his most memorable line:

This is our Lordly Hudson hardly flowing

under the green-grown cliffs

and has no peer in Europe or the East.

Be quiet, heart! Home! Home!

The phrase "lordly Hudson" had been first penned by Washington Irving in the early 1800s.

Composer Ned Rorem put Goodman's poem "The Lordly Hudson" to art song. The Music Library Association called it the best published song of 1948. Soprano Janet Fairbank premiered the work.

== Influence ==
Goodman influenced the poet Frank O'Hara, who liked Goodman's plain speech in his fiction, his act of writing poems occasionally, and his focus on New York City.

Composer Ned Rorem set many of Goodman's poems to art song.

== Collections ==
- Stop-Light: Five Dance Poems (1941)
- The Lordly Hudson: Collected Poems (1962)
- Hawkweed (1967)
- North Percy (1968)
- Homespun of Oatmeal Gray (1970)
- Collected Poems (1973)

== Works cited ==
- Diggory, Terence (2009). "Goodman, Paul". Encyclopedia of the New York School Poets. Infobase Publishing. pp. 200–202. ISBN 978-1-4381-1905-2.
- Kostelanetz, Richard (1969). "Paul Goodman: Persistence and Prevalence". Master Minds: Portraits of Contemporary American Artists and Intellectuals. New York: Macmillan. pp. 270–288. OCLC 23458.
- Nicely, Tom (1979). Adam and His Work: A Bibliography of Sources by and about Paul Goodman (1911–1972). Metuchen, N.J.: Scarecrow Press. ISBN 978-0-8108-1219-2. OCLC 4832535.
- Rogoff, Leonard (1997). "Paul Goodman". In Shatzky, Joel; Taub, Michael (eds.). Contemporary Jewish-American Novelists: A Bio-critical Sourcebook. Westport, Connecticut: Greenwood. pp. 128–139. ISBN 978-0-313-29462-4. OCLC 35758115.
- Rorem, Ned (1983a). "Remembering a Poet". Setting the Tone. Coward-McCann. pp. 358–360.
- Smith, Ernest J. (2001). "Paul Goodman". In Hansom, Paul (ed.). Twentieth-Century American Cultural Theorists. Dictionary of Literary Biography. Vol. 246. pp. 177–189. ISBN 0-7876-4663-6. Gale MZRHFV506143794.
- Stoehr, Taylor (1986). "Adam and Everyman: Paul Goodman in His Stories". Words and Deeds: Essays on the Realistic Imagination. New York: AMS Press. pp. 149–164. ISBN 978-0-404-61578-9. OCLC 11001514.
- — (October 1994c). "Graffiti and the Imagination: Paul Goodman in His Short Stories". Harvard Library Bulletin. 5 (3): 20–37. ISSN 0017-8136.
