= Parents' Day (novel) =

1951 novel by Paul Goodman

- Author: Paul Goodman
- Language: English
- Genre: Autobiographical; LGBT
- Publisher: The 5x8 Press
- Publication date: 1951
- Publication place: United States
- Media type: Print
- Pages: 223
- OCLC: 2916607
- Dewey Decimal: 813.52
- LC Class: PS3513 .O527 P3

Parents' Day is a 1951 novel by Paul Goodman. Written as autobiographical fiction based on the author's experiences teaching at the upstate New York progressive boarding school Manumit during the 1943–1944 year, the book's narrator grapples with his homosexuality and explores a series of sexual attractions and relationships that culminates in his being fired by the school. Goodman wrote the novel as part of a Reichian self-analysis begun in 1946 to better understand his own life. He struggled to find a publisher and ultimately self-published through a friend's small press. Reviewers remarked on unease in Goodman's sexual revelations, lack of self-awareness, and lack of coherence in the text. Parents' Day sold poorly and has been largely forgotten, save for some recognition as an early gay American novel.

== Background ==
In the United States during the era of this book's publication, homosexuality was deemed a mental illness with deleterious effects on health. Literature covering gay issues was scarce. By the time of the book's publication, its author, Paul Goodman had developed a reputation for publishing on a panoply of topics.

== Synopsis ==
In Parents' Day, an unnamed male in his thirties begins teaching at a private school early in World War II. He is a single parent, having split with his wife. Early in the novel, the narrator announces his homosexuality and love for the 17-year-old Davy Drood. The narrator augurs that he will be fired for having a sexual relationship with a student, whereas heterosexual relationships with students were tolerated. When Davy seeks to have sex with a female student, the narrator tells the headmaster that they should provide contraceptives and facilitate an occasion for the pair. He questions whether he should tell Davy's mother on Parents' Day about his sexual attraction to Davy. The narrator has sex with a woman while thinking of Davy. He reveals that he had manually stimulated Davy through the blankets and the narrator ejaculated in his own pants. Jeff Deegan, a student with a crush on the narrator, fights Davy on Parents' Day. In a jealous betrayal by Jeff, the narrator is fired from the school.

The narrator's poems intersperse the text.

== Publication ==
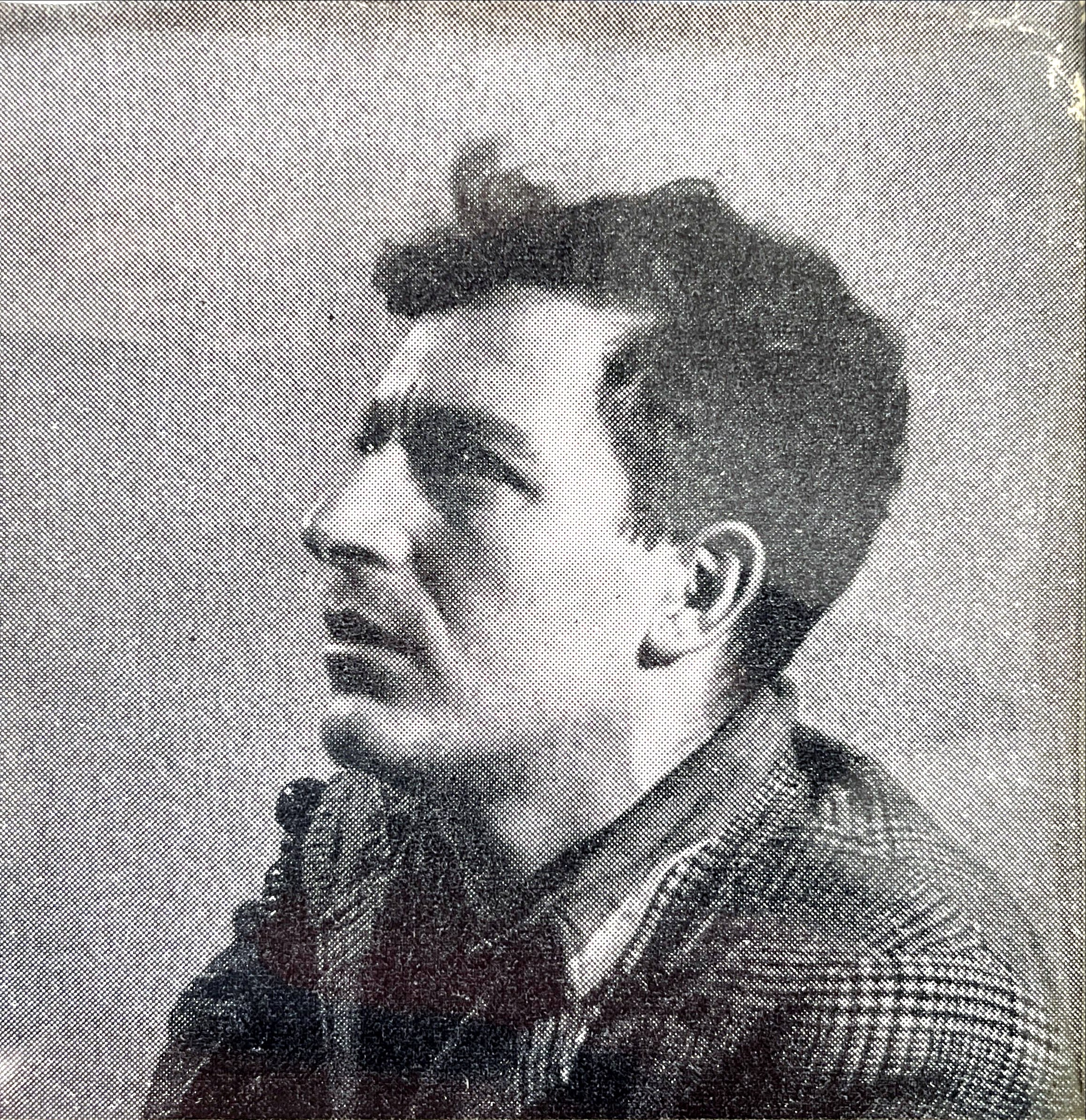
The author in the late 1940s

Parents' Day is autobiographical fiction in which Goodman explores and exaggerates his experience teaching at the upstate New York progressive boarding school Manumit, where he taught during the 1943–1944 school year until his firing for reasons related to his homosexual activity.

Goodman, in an effort to change his character and find his life's purpose, underwent a self-psychoanalysis beginning in 1946. From a disciple of psychoanalyst Wilhelm Reich, Goodman learned Reichian techniques, which he performed as a set of unsequenced exercises rather than an ordered program. After half a year with this disciple and half a year of Goodman's own free association, dream analysis, and other exercises, Goodman's self-analysis extended into an autobiographical novel based on the experiences at a progressive boarding school that led to his firing. This writing exercise gradually replaced his Reichian practice and exemplified how Goodman returned to his artistic practice to better understand his own life. Goodman's result, written from first-person perspective, was only barely concealed as fiction.

Goodman makes little effort to distinguish himself from his narrator characters throughout his fiction. In his life he celebrated his sexuality much the same as his characters celebrate theirs. The communal and psychosexual properties of physical touch are a recurring theme in his novels, as in Parents' Day the narrator's physical intimacy is expressed as an educational tool. Goodman referred to Parents' Day, alongside Making Do and The Break-up of Our Camp, as his three "community novels". The narrators in Parents' Day and Making Do are indistinguishable from Goodman's own persona as "a man of letters [and] man of the streets".

Parents' Day was originally titled The Fire, in reference to an incident in the book based on the real fire incident at Manumit during Goodman's 1943–1944 teaching year. It was later retitled. Goodman prepared a preface for the book that was cut prior to publication. Goodman's brother, Percival, illustrated the book. While Goodman finished the manuscript in 1949, he struggled to find a publisher based on the book's content.

The 5x8 Press of Saugatuck, Connecticut, published Parents' Day in 1951. Goodman's friend, Mortimer "Tony" Gran, who previously published Goodman's poetry, offered to print a book for Goodman in-between other printing jobs. Only 500 copies of the 1,400 printed copies were bound. Most of these 500 copies went unsold and the unbounded remainders were discarded. Black Sparrow Press of Santa Barbara reprinted Parents Day in 1985 with an afterword from Goodman's literary executor Taylor Stoehr and new illustrations from Goodman's brother. Free Press included an excerpt from the story in their 1976 anthology The Political Imagination in Literature.

== Analysis and legacy ==
A 2016 reader's guide to gay American novels called the novel a "personal apologia masquerading as fiction". An Iowa Journal of Literary Studies review saw Parents' Day as an honest view into Goodman's faults as a developing educator. It described Goodman as "introspective" and "non-judgmental" in acknowledging his unresolved unease in how he had acted on sincere desire but had hurt others in the process, and in how he would likely act the same under similar circumstances, following his impulse and suffering the consequences. Goodman presents various casual, compulsive liaisons as sexual substitutes for other people, writes literary critic Kingsley Widmer: boys for girls, wives for boys, boys for their mothers, such that Goodman's homosexuality is performed as a "labyrinthine dramatization of yearning and rejection". In the academic Donald Morton's analysis, the narrator's early conclusion that his homosexuality would prove impossible to reconcile with the school's community is an admission of the narrator's desires as "unrealistic" or "pathetic". In a contemporaneous review, Ruthven Todd wrote that the tumult of the narrator's thoughts obscured his perspective. The narrator desires community while alienating himself from the school's community. By Widmer's estimation, the narrator was either expecting or demanding his eventual rejection by the school community.

Summarizing Goodman's long fiction, Stan Sulkes wrote that Goodman's celebration of sexuality was "not always to good effect", especially when meant to confront the reader directly rather than make the reader grapple with the portrayed fictional situation. Goodman's insistence on speaking bluntly about his narrators' sexuality, especially given the thin veil between the narrator character and the author, was potentially both distracting and disconcerting for the reader, said Sulkes. Goodman showed a lack of self-awareness as an author, literary critic Kingsley Widmer thought, by making declarations at odds with his narrator's actions, such as the narrator saying he was "a good teacher" or defending his seductions while otherwise showing "predatory sexuality, vanity, caprice, self-pity, and contempt for others". Widmer criticized what he described as "portentously ruminative writing" with a vague, confessional tone in which the narrator is confused about his self-perception as "natural" or "sick". Ruthven Todd, for The Nation, concluded that the school's teachers were "more neurotic and obsessed" than its children. He likened the school's suffering to that of a battlefield.

Judging the novel as "weak" and "awkward" overall, though slightly better than Goodman's The Empire City, literary critic Kingsley Widmer described multiple deficiencies in Goodman's writing, including unintroduced main characters, undeveloped women characters, and careless narration. Widmer said Goodman's interpersed poems were stiff and hurt his narrative. A 2016 reader's guide to gay American novels wrote that the book's parts do not cohere into a whole. Conflict is mostly absent from the novel, apart from its concluding sequence. The Iowa Journal of Literary Studies, however, appreciated the book's balance of humor, such as how the author's serious, existential, questioning tone juxtaposes with his enthusiasm for sex, often exacerbating the former. Some themes of the book that persist in other works by Goodman include unpursued desire, lack of community, and how intentional community might form from common purpose.

While Goodman later became known as an educator, his belief in the educator's role in their students' sexual development contributed to his ill repute during the 1940s and 1950s. Literary critic Kingsley Widmer said Goodman's public endorsement of adolescent sexuality was both jarring for the 1940s and novel among Americans. Among gay novels, the progressive school's permissive setting and general tolerance for the narrator's homosexuality (but not pederasty) made for a more evocative memoir, wrote Roger Austin. Though the book sold poorly, Goodman's literary executor Taylor Stoehr wrote that the book became a gay underground classic with influence that outpaced its circulation. Stan Sulkes's survey of Goodman's long fiction more directly said the book was "largely forgotten" and not even collected by research libraries.

== Bibliography ==
- Austen, Roger (1977). "Parents' Day". Playing the Game: The Homosexual Novel in America. Indianapolis: Bobbs-Merrill. pp. 177–178. ISBN 0-672-52287-X.
- Gunn, Drewey Wayne (2016). "Paul Goodman: Parents' Day, 1951; Making Do, 1963". Gay American Novels, 1870–1970: A Reader's Guide. McFarland. pp. 79–80. ISBN 978-1-4766-2522-5.
- Horowitz, Steve (1986). "Rev. of Parents' Day". Iowa Journal of Literary Studies. 7 (1): 167–168. doi:10.17077/0743-2747.1209. ISSN 0743-2747.
- Mader, Donald (2002). "Walter H. Breen (J. Z. Eglinton)". In Bullough, Vern L. (ed.). Before Stonewall: Activists for Gay and Lesbian Rights in Historical Context. New York: Harrington Park Press. pp. 312–321. ISBN 978-1-56023-192-9.
- Morton, Donald (1990). "The Cultural Politics of (Sexual) Knowledge: On the Margins with Goodman". Social Text (25/26): 227–241. doi:10.2307/466248. ISSN 0164-2472. JSTOR 466248.
- Nicely, Tom (1979). "Parents Day". Adam and His Work: A Bibliography of Sources by and about Paul Goodman (1911–1972). Scarecrow Press. pp. 52–53. ISBN 978-0-8108-1219-2.
- — (1986). "Adam and His Work: A Bibliographical Update". In Parisi, Peter (ed.). Artist of the Actual: Essays on Paul Goodman. Scarecrow Press. pp. 153–183. ISBN 978-0-8108-1843-9.
- Stoehr, Taylor (1994). Here Now Next: Paul Goodman and the Origins of Gestalt Therapy. Jossey-Bass. ISBN 978-0-7879-0005-2.
- Sulkes, Stan (2010). "Paul Goodman". In Rollyson, Carl (ed.). Critical Survey of Long Fiction (4th ed.). Salem Press. pp. 1892–1900. ISBN 978-1-58765-535-7.
- Todd, Ruthven (July 5, 1952). "Some Recent Fiction (Rev. of Parents' Day)". The Nation. Vol. 175, no. 1. pp. 17–18. ISSN 0027-8378.
- Weltman, Burton (Spring 2000). "Revisiting Paul Goodman: Anarcho-Syndicalism as the American Way of Life". Educational Theory. 50 (2): 179–199. doi:10.1111/j.1741-5446.2000.00179.x. ISSN 1741-5446. EBSCOhost 3402989.
- Widmer, Kingsley (1980). Paul Goodman. Twayne. ISBN 0-8057-7292-8.
