= Parents' Day (disambiguation) =

Parents' Day is a holiday celebrating parents.

Parents' Day may also refer to:

- A school's parent visitation day, open house activities in which parents are invited
- Parent's Day (Camp Lazlo episode), a 2005 episode of animated television series Camp Lazlo
- Parents' Day (D:TNG episode), a 2001 episode of Canadian television series Degrassi: The Next Generation
- Parents' Day (Moldova), a holiday in Maldova
- Parents' Day (novel), a 1951 novel by Paul Goodman
