= The Copernican Revolution (disambiguation) =

The Copernican Revolution is the radical shift in Western cosmology named after the astronomer Nicholas Copernicus.

It may also refer to:

- The Copernican Revolution (book), 1957 book by philosopher Thomas Kuhn
- The Copernican Revolution (poetry), 1946 poetry by Paul Goodman
