= People or Personnel =

Book critique of centralized power by Raul Goodman

- First edition
- Author: Paul Goodman
- Subject: Sociology
- Published: 1965 (Random House)
- Pages: 247
- OCLC: 918343863
- LC Class: HN58 G66

People or Personnel is a critique of centralized power written by Paul Goodman and published by Random House in 1965.

An essay on anarchism in management described the book as being demonstrative of the "practical anarchism" epoch of the 1960s and 1970s.

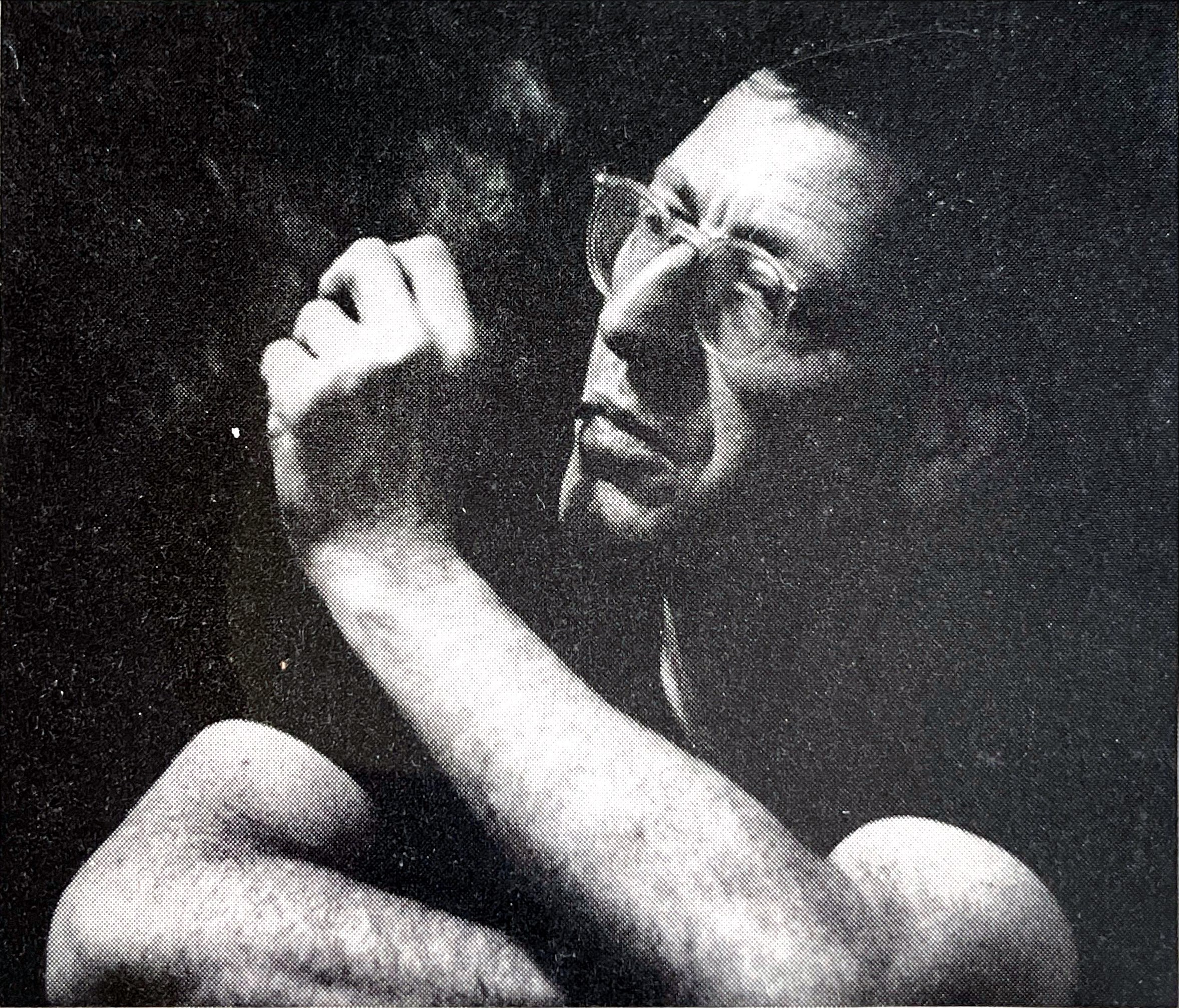
The author, c. 1964

== Publication ==
Some of the book's writing originated in his notes for a seminar in urban affairs at University of Wisconsin–Milwaukee. These "Notes on Decentralization" were published in Dissent in 1964, republished in his 1977 expanded edition of Drawing the Line, and appeared in other edited volumes.

Random House published People or Personnel: Decentralizing and the Mixed System in 1965. Its appendices contain five previously published articles: "Getting into Power" (Liberation, 1962); "Avoiding Responsibility" (previously "The Establishment as a Moral Illegitimate" in Village Voice, 1964); "A New Deal for the Arts" (Commentary, 1964); "Engaged Editing" (his preface to Seeds of Liberation, 1964); and "An Example of Spontaneous Administration" (previously "Columbia's Unorthodox Seminars" in Harper's, 1964). This edition also includes three public memoranda as appendices: to the Poverty Program, the Office of Education, and the Ford Foundation. The aforementioned articles refer to his then-forthcoming book on decentralization by different titles, including Ways of Running Things and Decentralizing and the Mixed System.

Sections of the book were later reprinted in Frank Tannenbaum's A Community of Scholars: The University Seminars at Columbia (1965), Ronald Gross and Paul Osterman's Individualism: Man in Modern Society (1971), and Liberation magazine. The book's first chapter, originally published as "On Some Prima Facie Objections to Decentralism" (Liberation, 1964), was condensed and reprinted in the 1966 edited volume Patterns of Anarchy. People or Personnel's manuscripts and galley proof are held in Syracuse University's special collections.

Vintage Books published a dual paperback edition in February 1968 combining People or Personnel with Like a Conquered Province, adding additional republished essays for the latter's appendices.

== Reception ==
People or Personnel is among Goodman's best known works of social criticism.

== Bibliography ==
- Nicely, Tom (1979). Adam and His Work: A Bibliography of Sources by and about Paul Goodman (1911–1972). Metuchen, NJ: Scarecrow Press. ISBN 978-0-8108-1219-2. OCLC 4832535.
