= Those Drinking Days =

1981 memoir by Donald Newlove

- Author: Donald Newlove
- Subject: Memoir
- Publisher: Horizon Press
- Publication date: 1981
- Pages: 176

Those Drinking Days is a 1981 memoir by novelist Donald Newlove about his alcoholism.

It became his bestselling book.
