= Paul Goodman =

American writer and public intellectual (1911–1972)

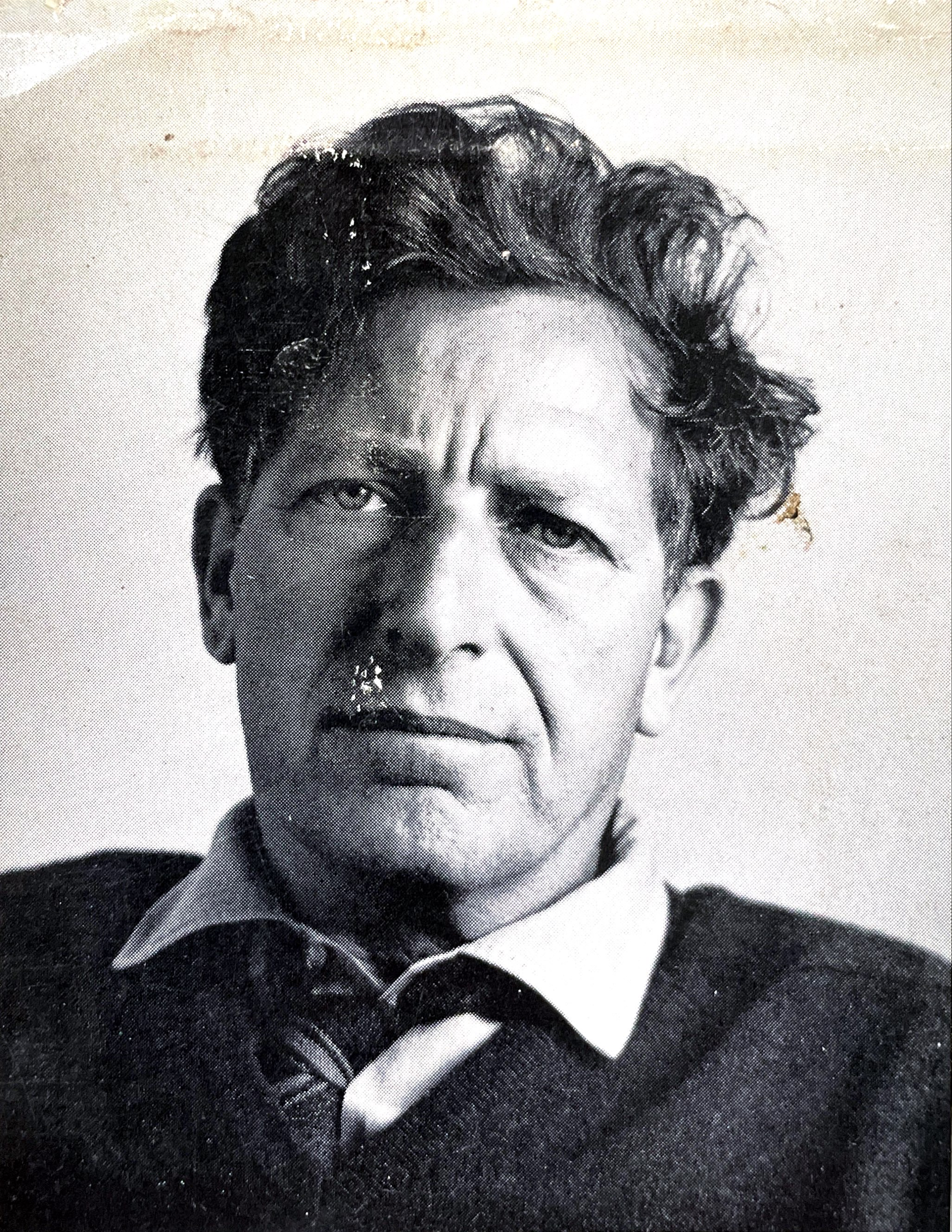
- Goodman, 1969
- Born: September 9, 1911; New York City, U.S.
- Died: August 2, 1972 (aged 60); North Stratford, New Hampshire, U.S.
- Education: City College of New York (AB); University of Chicago (PhD)
- Occupations: Writer; teacher
- Years active: 1941–1972
- Known for: Social criticism, fiction
- Notable work: Growing Up Absurd, Communitas, Gestalt Therapy

Paul Goodman (September 9, 1911 – August 2, 1972) was an American writer and public intellectual best known for his 1960s works of social criticism. Goodman was prolific across numerous literary genres and non-fiction topics, including the arts, civil rights, decentralization, democracy, education, media, politics, psychology, technology, urban planning, and war. As a humanist and self-styled man of letters, his works often addressed a common theme of the individual citizen's duties in the larger society, and the responsibility to exercise autonomy, act creatively, and realize one's own human nature.

Born to a Jewish family in New York City, Goodman was raised by his aunts and sister and attended City College of New York. As an aspiring writer, he wrote and published poems and fiction before receiving his doctorate from the University of Chicago. He returned to writing in New York City and took sporadic magazine writing and teaching jobs, several of which he lost for his overt bisexuality and his draft resistance during World War II. Goodman discovered anarchism and wrote for libertarian journals. His radicalism was rooted in psychological theory. He co-wrote the theory behind Gestalt therapy based on Wilhelm Reich's radical Freudianism and held psychoanalytic sessions through the 1950s while continuing to write prolifically.

His 1960 book of social criticism, Growing Up Absurd, established his importance as a mainstream, antiestablishment cultural theorist. Goodman became known as "the philosopher of the New Left" and his anarchistic disposition was influential in 1960s counterculture and the free school movement. Despite being the foremost American intellectual of non-Marxist radicalism in his time, his celebrity did not endure far beyond his life. Goodman is remembered for his utopian proposals and principled belief in human potential.

== Early life and education ==
Goodman was born in New York City on September 9, 1911, to Augusta and Barnette Goodman. His Sephardic Jewish ancestors had emigrated to New York from Germany a century before the great wave of immigrants from Eastern Europe that began in the late 19th century. His grandfather had fought in the American Civil War, and the family was "relatively prosperous". Goodman's insolvent father abandoned the family prior to his birth, making Paul their fourth and last child, after Alice (1902–1969) and Percival (1904–1989). Their mother worked as a women's clothes traveling saleswoman, which left young Paul to be raised mostly by his aunts and sister in New York City's Washington Heights, with petty bourgeois values.

Goodman attended Hebrew school as well as the city's public schools, where he performed well and developed a strong affinity with Manhattan. He excelled in literature and languages during his time at Townsend Harris Hall High School, graduating atop his class in 1927. He enrolled at City College of New York that year, where he studied classical literature, majored in philosophy, was influenced by the Jewish philosopher Morris Raphael Cohen, and found both lifelong friends and his intellectual social circle. Goodman came to identify with "community anarchism" after reading Peter Kropotkin as an undergraduate, and retained that affiliation throughout his life. He graduated from City College with a bachelor's degree in 1931, early in the Great Depression.

As an aspiring writer, Goodman wrote and published poems, essays, stories, and a play while living with his sister Alice, who supported him. Only a few of these were published. He did not keep a regular job, but read scripts for Metro-Goldwyn-Mayer and taught drama at a Zionist youth summer camp from 1934 through 1936. Unable to afford tuition, Goodman audited graduate classes at Columbia University, and traveled to some classes at Harvard University. When Columbia philosophy professor Richard McKeon moved to the University of Chicago, he invited Goodman to attend and lecture. (Note: Smith 2001, p. 179. As a student of McKeon's, Goodman is considered part of the Chicago School of literary criticism.) Between 1936 and 1940, Goodman was a graduate student in literature and philosophy, a research assistant, and part-time instructor. He took his preliminary exams in 1940, but was forced out for "nonconformist sexual behavior", a charge that would recur multiple times in his teaching career. By this point of his life, Goodman was married and continued to cruise for young men, as an active bisexual.

Homesick and absent his doctorate, Goodman returned to writing in New York City, where he was affiliated with the literary avant-garde. Goodman worked on his dissertation, though it would take 14 years to publish. Unable to find work as a teacher, he reviewed films in Partisan Review and in the next two years, published his first book of poetry (1941) and novel (The Grand Piano, 1942). He taught at Manumit, a progressive boarding school, in 1943 and 1944, but was let go for "homosexual behavior". Partisan Review too removed Goodman for his bisexuality and draft resistance advocacy. (Goodman himself was deferred and rejected from the World War II draft.)

== Career as writer and exploration of psychotherapy ==
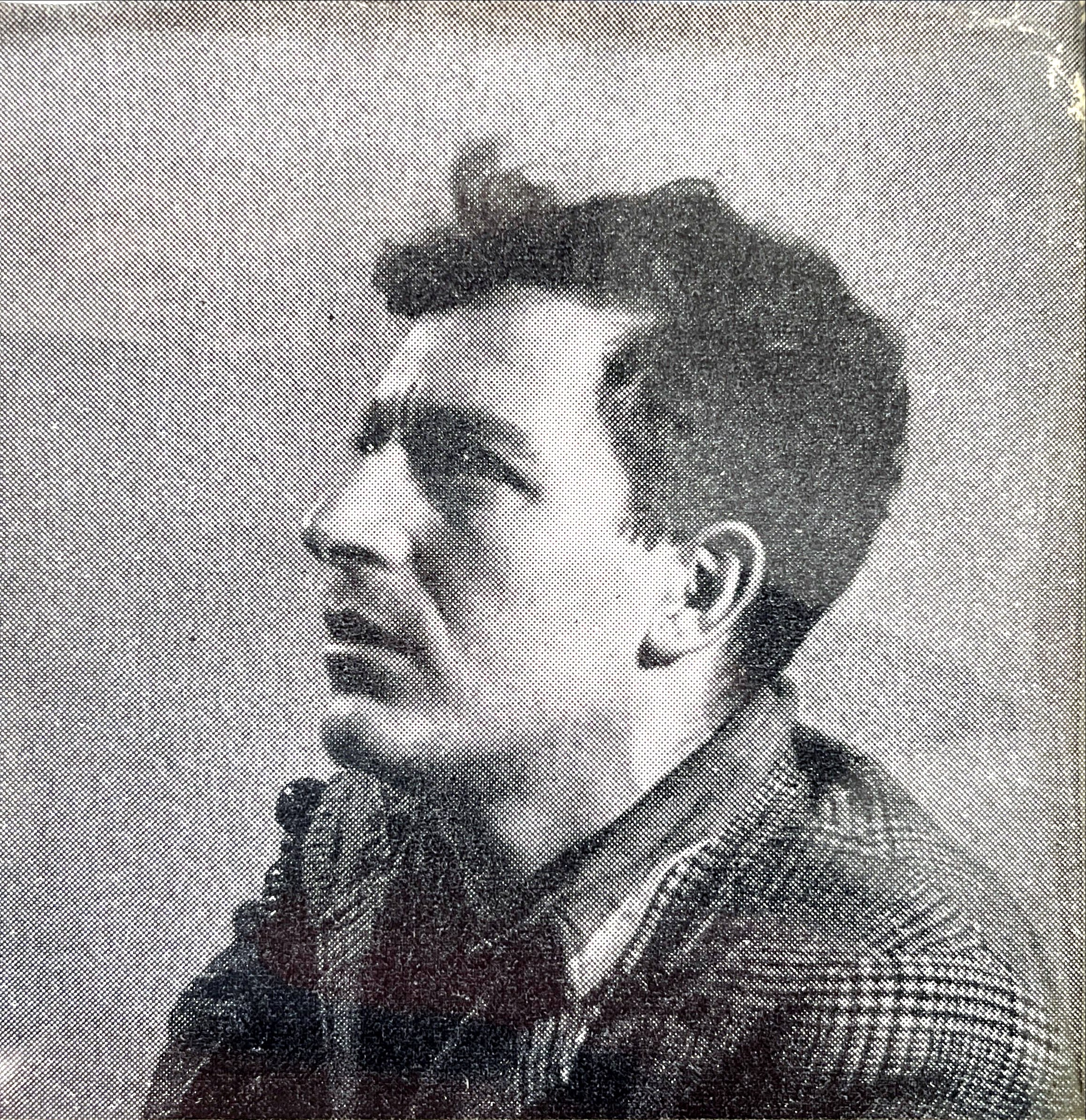
Goodman in the late 1940s

World War II politicized Goodman from an avant-garde author into a vocal pacifist and decentralist. His exploration of anarchism led him to publish in the libertarian journals of New York's Why? Group and Dwight Macdonald's Politics. Goodman's collected anarchist essays from this period, "The May Pamphlet", undergird the libertarian social criticism he would pursue for the rest of his life.

Aside from anarchism, the late 1940s marked Goodman's expansion into psychoanalytic therapy and urban planning. In 1945, Goodman started a second common-law marriage that would last until his death. Apart from teaching gigs at New York University night school and a summer at Black Mountain College, the family lived in poverty on his wife's salary. By 1946, Goodman was a popular yet "marginal" figure in New York bohemia, and he began to participate in psychoanalytic therapy with Alexander Lowen. Through contact with the eminent analyst Wilhelm Reich, he began a self-psychoanalysis. Around the same time, Goodman and his brother, the architect Percival, wrote Communitas (1947). It argued that rural and urban living had not been functionally integrated and became known as a major work of urban planning following Goodman's eventual celebrity.

Fritz Perls and his wife Lore contacted Goodman after reading his writings on Reich, and began a friendship that yielded the Gestalt therapy movement. Goodman authored the theoretical chapter of their co-written 1951 book Gestalt Therapy. During the early 1950s, he continued with his psychoanalytic sessions and began his own occasional, unlicensed practice. He continued in this occupation through 1960, taking patients, running groups, and leading classes at the Gestalt Therapy Institutes.

During this psychoanalytic period, Goodman continued to consider himself foremost an artist and wrote prolifically even as his lack of wider recognition weathered his resolve. Before starting with Gestalt therapy, Goodman published the novel State of Nature, the book of anarchist and aesthetic essays Art and Social Nature, and the academic monograph Kafka's Prayer. He spent 1948 and 1949 writing in New York and published The Break-Up of Our Camp, a short story collection, followed by two novels: the 1950 The Dead of Spring and the 1951 Parents' Day. He returned to his writing and therapy practice in New York City in 1951 and received his Ph.D. in 1954 from the University of Chicago, whose press published his dissertation as The Structure of Literature the same year. The Living Theatre staged his theatrical work.

Mid-decade, Goodman entered a life crisis when publishers did not want his epic novel The Empire City, a new lay therapist licensing law excluded Goodman, and his daughter contracted polio. He embarked to Europe in 1958 where, through reflections on American social ills and respect for Swiss patriotism, Goodman became zealously concerned with improving America. He read the founding fathers and resolved to write patriotic social criticism that would appeal to his fellow citizens rather than criticize from the sidelines. Throughout the late 1950s, Goodman continued to publish in journals including Commentary, Dissent, Liberation (for which he became an unofficial editor), and The Kenyon Review. The Empire City was published in 1959. His work had brought little money or fame up to this point. It was a low point of his life that would soon change dramatically.

== Social criticism ==
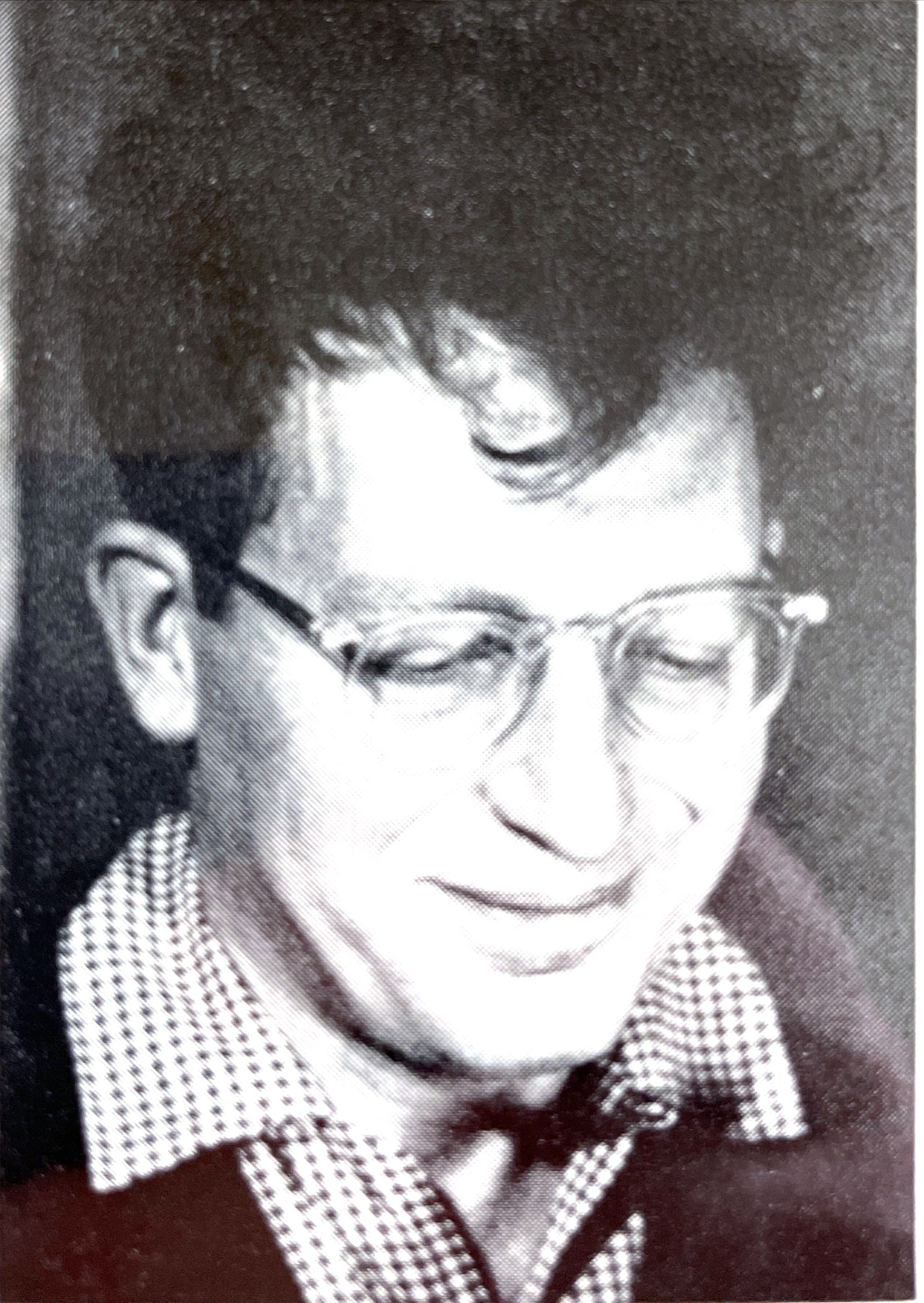
Goodman, c. 1959

Goodman's 1960 study of alienated youth in America, Growing Up Absurd, established his importance as a mainstream cultural theorist and pillar of leftist thought during the counterculture. Released to moderate acclaim, it became the major book by which 1960s American youth understood themselves. The book of social criticism assured the young that they were right to feel disaffected about growing up into a society without meaningful community, spirit, sex, or work. He proposed alternatives in topics across the humanist spectrum from family, school, and work, through media, political activism, psychotherapy, quality of life, racial justice, and religion. In contrast to contemporaneous mores, Goodman praised traditional, simple values, such as honor, faith, and vocation, and the humanist history of art and heroes as providing hope for a more meaningful society.

Goodman's frank vindications and outsider credentials resonated with the young. Throughout the sixties, Goodman would direct his work towards them as a father figure. Impressed by his personal integrity and the open defiance by which he lived his life, they came to regard him as a model for free life in a bureaucratic country and he came to regard himself as their Dutch uncle. He spoke regularly on college campuses, discussing tactics with students, and seeking to cultivate youth movements, such as Students for a Democratic Society and the Berkeley Free Speech Movement, that would take up his political message. As an early ally, he had a particular affinity for the Berkeley movement, which he identified as anarchist in character. Goodman became known both as the movement's philosopher and as "the philosopher of the New Left".

While he continued to write for "little magazines", Goodman now reached mainstream audiences and began to make money. Multiple publishers were engaged in reissuing his books, reclaiming his backlog of unpublished fiction, and publishing his new social commentary. He continued to publish at least a book a year for the rest of his life, including critiques of education (The Community of Scholars and Compulsory Miseducation), a treatise on decentralization (People or Personnel), a "memoir-novel" (Making Do), and collections of poetry, sketch stories, and previous articles. He produced a collection of critical broadcasts he had given in Canada as Like a Conquered Province. His books from this period influenced the free university and free school movements. On the intellectual speaking circuit, Goodman was in high demand.

Goodman taught in a variety of academic institutions. He was the Washington Institute for Policy Studies's first visiting scholar before serving multiple semester-long university appointments in New York, London, and Hawaii. He was the Knapp Distinguished Scholar in urban affairs at the University of Wisconsin–Milwaukee and became the first San Francisco State College professor to be hired by students, paid by a student self-imposed tax. While continuing to lecture, Goodman participated in the 1960s counterculture war protests and draft resistance, including the first mass draft-card burning. Goodman's son, a Cornell University student, was also active in draft resistance and was under investigation by the FBI before his accidental mountaineering death in 1967, which launched Goodman into a prolonged depression.

Vanguardist groups turned on Goodman towards the end of the decade. Believing his politics to stifle their revolutionary fervor, they began to heckle and vilify him. Goodman, who enjoyed polemics, was undeterred by their words but dispirited by the movement's turn towards insurrectionary politics. In the early 70s, Goodman wrote works that summarized his experience, such as New Reformation and Little Prayers & Finite Experience.

His health worsened due to a heart condition, and he died of a heart attack at his farm in North Stratford, New Hampshire, on August 2, 1972, at the age of 60. His in-progress works (Little Prayers and Collected Poems) were published posthumously.

== Literature ==
Though he was prolific across many literary forms and topical categories, as a humanist, he thought of his writing as serving one common subject—"the organism and the environment"—and one common, pragmatic aim: that the writing should effect a change. Indeed, Goodman's poetry, fiction, drama, literary criticism, urban planning, psychological, cultural, and educational theory addressed the theme of the individual citizen's duties in the larger society, especially the responsibility to exercise free action and creativity. While his fiction and poetry was noted in his time, following Growing Up Absurd's success, he diverted his attention from literature and spent his final decade pursuing the social and cultural criticism that forms the basis of his legacy.

As an avant-garde litterateur, Goodman's work was frequently experimental.

Goodman's prose has, commonly, been criticized for its sloppiness or impenetrability. In a survey of Goodman's writings, literary critic Kingsley Widmer described characteristic traits of poor organization, pedantry, and overassertion. Dwight Macdonald said that Goodman's lack of self-editing hampered and left his many "valuable ideas" undeveloped. "It was a credit to him," Macdonald wrote, "that he could make such an impact without taking pains with his writing." George Orwell's classic essay on poor writing, Politics and the English Language, notably rebukes an example of Goodman's rhapsodic, jargon-heavy psychoanalytic prose.

Composer Ned Rorem set many of Goodman's poems to art song.

== Thought and influence ==
Goodman believed that humans were inherently creative, communal, and loving, except when societal institutions alienate individuals from their natural selves, such as making them suppress their impulses to serve the institution. Goodman's oeuvre addressed humanism broadly across multiple disciplines and sociopolitical topics including the arts, civil planning, civil rights and liberties, decentralization and self-regulation, democracy, education, ethics, media, technology, "return to the land", war, and peace. When criticized for prioritizing breadth over depth, Goodman would reply that his interests did not break neatly into disciplines and that his works concerned the common topics of human nature and community as derived from his concrete experience. He fashioned himself a man of letters and artist-humanist, i.e., a public thinker who writes about the human condition and who creates not as a visual artist but by discharging his duties as a citizen. Goodman's wide interests reflected a concept he believed, acted on, and titled one of his books—The Society I Live in Is Mine—that everything is everyone's business. Goodman was prolific in sharing specific ideas for improving society to match his aims, and actively advocated for them in frequent lectures, letters, op-eds, and media appearances.

Goodman's intellectual development followed three phases. His experience in marginal subcommunities, small anarchist publications, and bohemian New York City through the 1940s formed his core, radical principles, such as decentralization and pacifism. His first transformation was in psychological theory, as Goodman moved past the theories of Wilhelm Reich to develop Gestalt therapy with Fritz Perls. His second transformation opened his approach to social criticism. He resolved to write positively, patriotically, and accessibly about reform for a larger audience rather than simply resisting conformity and "drawing the line" between himself and societal pressures. This approach was foundational to building the New Left.

=== Politics and social thought ===
External audio
- Goodman's 1966 Massey Lecture on a decent society, useful technology, rural reconstruction, and American democracy

Goodman was most famous as a political thinker and social critic. Following his ascent with Growing Up Absurd (1960), his books spoke to young radicals, whom he encouraged to reclaim Thomas Jefferson's radical democracy as their anarchist birthright. Goodman's anarchist politics of the forties had an afterlife influence in the politics of the sixties' New Left. His World War II-era essays on the draft, moral law, civic duty, and resistance against violence were re-purposed for youth grappling with the Vietnam War. Even as American activism grew increasingly violent in the late 1960s, Goodman retained hope that a new populism, almost religious in nature, would bring about a consensus to live more humanely. His political beliefs shifted little over his life, though his message as a social critic had been fueled by his pre-1960 experiences as a Gestalt therapist and dissatisfaction with his role as an artist.

As a decentralist, Goodman was skeptical of power and believed that human fallibility required power to be deconcentrated to reduce its harm. "Anarchists", Goodman wrote, "want to increase intrinsic functioning and diminish extrinsic power". His "peasant anarchism" was less dogma than disposition: he held that the small things in life (little property, food, sex) were paramount, while power worship, central planning, and ideology were perilous. He rejected grand schemes to reorganize the world and instead argued for decentralized counter-institutions across society to downscale societal organization into small, community-based units that better served immediate needs. Goodman blamed political centralization and a power elite for withering populism and creating a "psychology of powerlessness". He advocated for alternative systems of order that eschewed "top-down direction, standard rules, and extrinsic rewards like salary and status". Goodman often referenced classical republican ideology, such as improvised, local political decision-making and principles like honor and craftsmanship.

He defined political action as any novel individual initiative (e.g., policy, enterprise, idea) without wide acceptance. Goodman believed that one's duty as a citizen, nevertheless as a student or faculty member, was to take political stances. Civil liberty, to Goodman, was less about freedom from coercive institutions, as commonly articulated in anarchist politics, and more about freedom to initiate within a community, as is necessary for the community's continued evolution. He believed individual initiative—human ardor and animal drives—and the everyday conflict it creates to be the foundation of communities and a quality to be promoted. Love and the creative rivalry of fraternity, wrote Goodman, is what spurs the individual initiative to do what none could do alone.

Goodman followed in the tradition of Enlightenment rationalism. Like Immanuel Kant in What Is Enlightenment? (one of Goodman's favorite essays), Goodman structured his core beliefs around autonomy: the human ability to pursue one's own initiative and follow through, as distinct from "freedom". Influenced by Aristotle, Goodman additionally advocated for self-actualization through participating in societal discourse, rather than using politics solely to choose leaders and divvy resources. He adhered to Deweyan pragmatism—the pursuit of practical knowledge to guide one's actions—and spoke about its misappropriation in American society. Goodman praised classless, everyday, democratic values associated with American frontier culture. He lionized American radicals who championed such values. Goodman was interested in radicalism native to the United States, such as populism and Randolph Bourne's anarcho-pacifism, and distanced himself from Marxism and European radicalism.

Goodman is associated with the New York Intellectuals circle of college-educated, secular Jews, despite his political differences with the group. Goodman's anarchist politics alienated him from his Marxist peers in the 1930s and 40s as well as later when their thought became increasingly conservative. He criticized the intellectuals as having first sold out to Communism and then to the "organized system". Goodman's affiliations with the New York Intellectuals provided much of his early publishing connections and success, especially as he saw rejection from the literary establishment. Goodman found fonder camaraderie among anarchists and experimentalists such as the Why? Group and the Living Theater. Goodman's role as a New York Intellectual cultural figure was satirized alongside his coterie in Delmore Schwartz's The World Is a Wedding and namechecked in Woody Allen's Annie Hall.

Despite early interest in the civil rights movement, Goodman was not as involved with its youth activists.

=== Psychology ===
Goodman's radicalism was based in psychological theory, his views on which evolved throughout his life. He first adopted radical Freudianism based in fixed human instincts and the politics of Wilhelm Reich. Goodman believed that natural human instinct (akin to Freud's id) served to help humans resist alienation, advertising, propaganda, and will to conform. He moved away from Reichian individualistic id psychology towards a view of the nonconforming self integrated with society. Several factors precipitated this change. First, Reich, a Marxist, criticized Goodman's anarchist interpretation of his work. Second, as a follower of Aristotle, belief in a soul pursuing its intrinsic telos fit Goodman's idea of socialization better than the Freudian conflict model. Third, as a follower of Kant, Goodman believed in the self as a synthesized combination of internal human nature and the external world. As he developed these thoughts, Goodman met Fritz Perls in 1946. The pair together challenged Reich and developed the theory of Gestalt therapy atop traits of Reich's radical Freudianism.

Gestalt therapy emphasizes the living present over the past and conscious activity over the unconsciousness of dreams. The therapy is based in finding and confronting unresolved issues in one's habitual behavior and social environment to become a truer, more self-aware version of oneself. It encourages clients to embrace spontaneity and active engagement in their present lives. Unlike the silent Freudian analyst, Goodman played an active, confrontational role as therapist. He believed his role was less to cure sickness than to adjust clients to their realities in accordance with their own desires by revealing their blocked potential. The therapist, to Goodman, should act as a "fellow citizen" with a responsibility to reflect the shared, societal sources of these blockages. These themes, of present engagement and of duty to identify shared ills, provided a theory of human nature and community that became the political basis of Goodman's New Left vision and subsequent career in social criticism. Goodman's collective therapy sessions functioned as mutual criticism on par with Oneida Community communal self-improvement meetings.

=== Education ===
External videos
- Goodman discusses the role of public schools with William F. Buckley Jr. on Firing Line, 1966

Goodman's thoughts on education came from his interest in progressive education and his experience with the Berkeley Free Speech Movement and free university movement.

Goodman invokes "human nature" as multifaceted and unearthed by new culture, institutions, and proposals. He offers no common definition of "human nature" and suggests that no common definition is needed even when claiming that some action is "against human nature". Goodman contends that humans are animals with tendencies and that a "human nature" forms between the human and an environment he deems suitable: a continually reinvented "free" society with a culture developed from and for the search for human powers. When denied this uninhibited growth, human nature is shackled, culture purged, and education impossible, regardless of the physical institution of schooling. Goodman saw himself as continuing the work started by John Dewey.

To Goodman, education aims to form a common humanity and, in turn, create a "worthwhile" world. He figured that "natural" human development has similar aims, which is to say that education and "growing up" are identical. "Mis-education", in comparison, has less to do with education or growing up, and is rather a brainwashing process of inculcating a singular worldview that discounts personal experience and feelings, with fearfulness and insecurity towards other worldviews. As outlined in Growing Up Absurd, a dearth of "worthwhile opportunities" in a society precludes both education and growing up. Goodman contended that a lack of community, patriotism, and honor stunts the normal development of human nature and leads to "resigned or fatalistic" youth. This resignation leads youth to "role play" the qualities expected of them.

Goodman's books on education extol the medieval university and advocated for alternative institutions of instruction. He advocates for replacing compulsory schooling with various forms of education more specific to individual interests, including the choice to not attend any school. He argues that the busyness of American high schools and extracurricular activities preclude students from developing their individual interests, and that students should spend years away from schooling before working towards a liberal arts college degree. Goodman believes in dismantling large educational institutions to create small college federations and "alternative colleges" that promoted direct relations between faculty and students. He was encouraged by the free university movement's initiative, as students actively pursued their genuine interests outside the traditional academic constraints of credits and requirements. This independent drive affirmed his belief that students have both the right and ability to organize as an exploited political class, assert their perspectives, and promote their views. He was discouraged when students did not express as much interest as he had in the Western tradition.

His works on American school social criticism were among the first in a 1960s body of literature that became known as the romantic critics of education. Critics of public schools borrowed his ideas for years after the 1960 publication of Growing Up Absurd, and Goodman's ideas on education reverberated for decades.

== Personal life ==
While Goodman anchored himself to larger traditions—characterized by some as a Renaissance man, a citizen of the world, a "child of the Enlightenment", and a man of letters—he also considered himself an American patriot, with fond affection for "our beautiful libertarian, pluralist and populist experiment". He valued what he called the provincial virtues of the country's national character, such as dutifulness, frugality, honesty, prudence, and self-reliance. He also valued curiosity, lust, and willingness to break rules for self-evident good.

Both of Goodman's marriages were common law; neither was state-officiated. Goodman was married to Virginia Miller between 1938 and 1943. Their daughter, Susan (1939), was born in Chicago. Between 1945 and his death, Goodman was married to Sally Duchsten. Their son, Mathew Ready, was born in 1946. They lived below the poverty line on her salary as a secretary, supplemented by Goodman's sporadic teaching assignments. With the proceeds from Growing Up Absurd (1960), his wife left her job and Goodman bought a farmhouse outside of North Stratford, New Hampshire, which they used as an occasional home. His third child, Daisy, was born in 1963. Towards the end of his life, despite the wealth that resulted from his fame, his family lived an unadorned life in an apartment on the Upper West Side of New York City.

Throughout his life, Goodman lost jobs for reasons related to his sexuality. By the time he was in Chicago and married, Goodman was an active bisexual who cruised bars and parks for young men. He was fired from his teaching position there for not taking his cruising off-campus. He was dismissed from the Partisan Review, the progressive boarding school Manumit, and Black Mountain College for reasons related to his sexuality.

Goodman was known for his paradoxical identity and contrarian stances. (Note: Rogoff 1997, p. 129: "Goodman was a man of enormous paradoxes"; Caserio 2000: "characteristically antithesis-laden" ... "Goodman's antinomic thought is expressed in his double political stance") He was, at once, an iconoclastic anarchist and a "neolithic conservative", a figurehead of the political left and regularly critical of it, an everyman who roamed New York for sex and handball and a self-described defender of Western civilization who held Aristotle and Kropotkin as his forebears. Growing Up Absurd professes his belief in the simultaneous paramountcy of both radical individuation and communalism. He believed in liberating coalitions but broke from black power and gay rights movements or coalitions whose collective power diminished individual autonomy. He loved to shock and his aggressive, cunning argumentative style tended towards polemics and explaining both how his interlocutor was completely wrong and from which basics they should begin anew. In his life, Goodman's professed egalitarianism and humanism sometimes clashed with his personal pretensions, intellectual arrogance, and "impatient imperviousness". While admirable that Goodman stuck to his unfashionable conviction, Irving Howe wrote, Goodman also had an air of "asphyxiating self-righteousness". Goodman's unmannered physical presence was a core piece of his presentation and idiosyncratic celebrity as a social gadfly, partly since Goodman himself championed a lack of separation between public and private lives. Dwight Macdonald said that Goodman did not have close relationships with his intellectual equals and was more personable with his younger admirers and disciples.

== Legacy ==
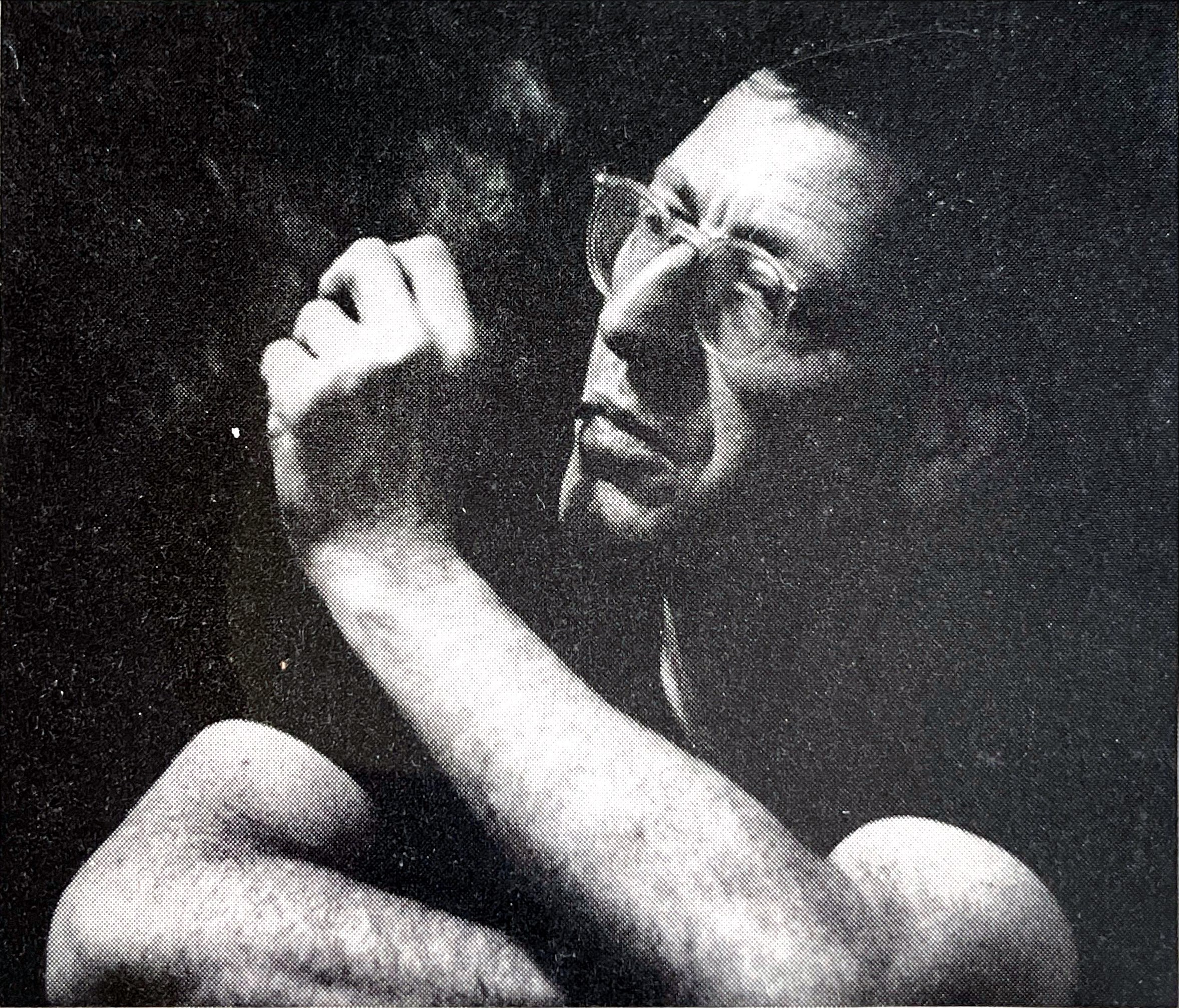
Goodman, c. 1964

In his time, Goodman was the foremost American intellectual within non-Marxist, Western radicalism, but he did not fit neatly into categories within the intellectual community. Though he wrote learnedly on topics spanning 21 different sections of the New York Public Library by the time of his death, he went largely unaccepted in these disciplines, owing partly to his resistance to specialization, his ornery personality, (Note: Rogoff 1997, p. 136: "Goodman's difficult personality cast a shadow on his literary reputation.") and his unrefined writing quality. His work went unrecognized in academic canon. As literary critic Kingsley Widmer put it, Goodman had not produced a singular masterwork.

Writing on Goodman's death, Susan Sontag described his intellect as underappreciated and his literary voice as the most "convincing, genuine, [and] singular" since D. H. Lawrence's. She lamented how "Goodman was always taken for granted even by his admirers", praised his literary breadth, and predicted that his poetry would eventually find widespread appreciation. Sontag called Goodman the "most important American writer" of her last twenty years. Literary critic Adam Kirsch later wrote that this was an eccentric opinion both for the time and 2012. Author Kerry Howley, panning Goodman's prose at the time of his 2010 PM Press republications, decried Sontag's and others' defense of Goodman, writing that "rarely in history has such a long list of luminaries come together to apologize for a single body of work".

Some of Goodman's ideas have been assimilated into mainstream thought: local community autonomy and decentralization, better balance between rural and urban life, morality-led technological advances, break-up of regimented schooling, art in mass media, and a culture less focused on a wasteful standard of living. Over time, the idea of "the system" entered common language and ceased to be a rallying cry. Goodman bridged the 1950s era of mass conformity and repression into the 1960s era of youth counterculture in his encouragement of dissent. His systemic societal critique was adopted by 1960s New Left radicals, and his Growing Up Absurd changed American public dialogue to focus "on the discontents of the young and the lack of humane values in much of our technocracy". Goodman influenced many of the late 1960s critics of education, including George Dennison, John Holt, Ivan Illich, and Everett Reimer.

His influence never took hold in the wider public. Goodman's public interest peaked with his late 1960s youth readership and waned as quickly as it came. Within decades Goodman was largely forgotten from public consciousness. Goodman's subsequent obscurity was itself the subject of a 2011 documentary. His literary executor wrote that much of Goodman's effectiveness relied on his electric, cantankerous presence. As a figure, Goodman is remembered for his utopian proposals and principled belief in human potential, and among scholars of the New York Intellectuals. As an individual, he is remembered for embarrassing anecdotes by those who knew him, and by those who did not, his views read today as sexist or pederastic.

Harvard University's Houghton Library acquired Goodman's papers in 1989. Though Goodman was known for his social criticism in his life, his literary executor Taylor Stoehr wrote in the 1990s that future generations would likely appreciate Goodman foremost for his poetry and fiction, which are also the works for which he wished to be known. Writing years later, Stoehr thought that the poems, some stories, and The Empire City would have the most future currency. Though Stoehr considered Goodman's social commentary just "as fresh in the nineties as ... in the sixties", everything but Communitas and Growing Up Absurd had gone out of print. As of the 2010s, Goodman's creative works had little enduring readership.

== Written works ==
- The May Pamphlet (1946)
- Kafka's Prayer (1947)
- Communitas (1947)
- Gestalt Therapy (1951)
- Parents' Day (1951)
- The Structure of Literature (1954)
- The Empire City (1959)
- Growing Up Absurd (1960)
- Utopian Essays and Practical Proposals (1962)
- The Community of Scholars (1962)
- Making Do (1963)
- Compulsory Miseducation (1964)
- People or Personnel (1965)
- Five Years (1966)
- Like a Conquered Province (1967)
- Adam and His Works: Collected Stories (1968)
- New Reformation (1970)
- Speaking and Language (1971)
- Little Prayers and Finite Experience (1972)
- Collected Poems (1973)

== See also ==
- List of American anarchists
- List of Jewish anarchists
- List of peace activists
