= The Community of Scholars =

1962 book about higher education by Paul Goodman

- First edition
- Author: Paul Goodman
- Subject: Higher education
- Published: 1962 (Random House)
- Pages: 175

The Community of Scholars is a 1962 book about higher education by Paul Goodman with his observations on its function and proposals for its future.

The book influenced the free university experiments of the 1960s counterculture.

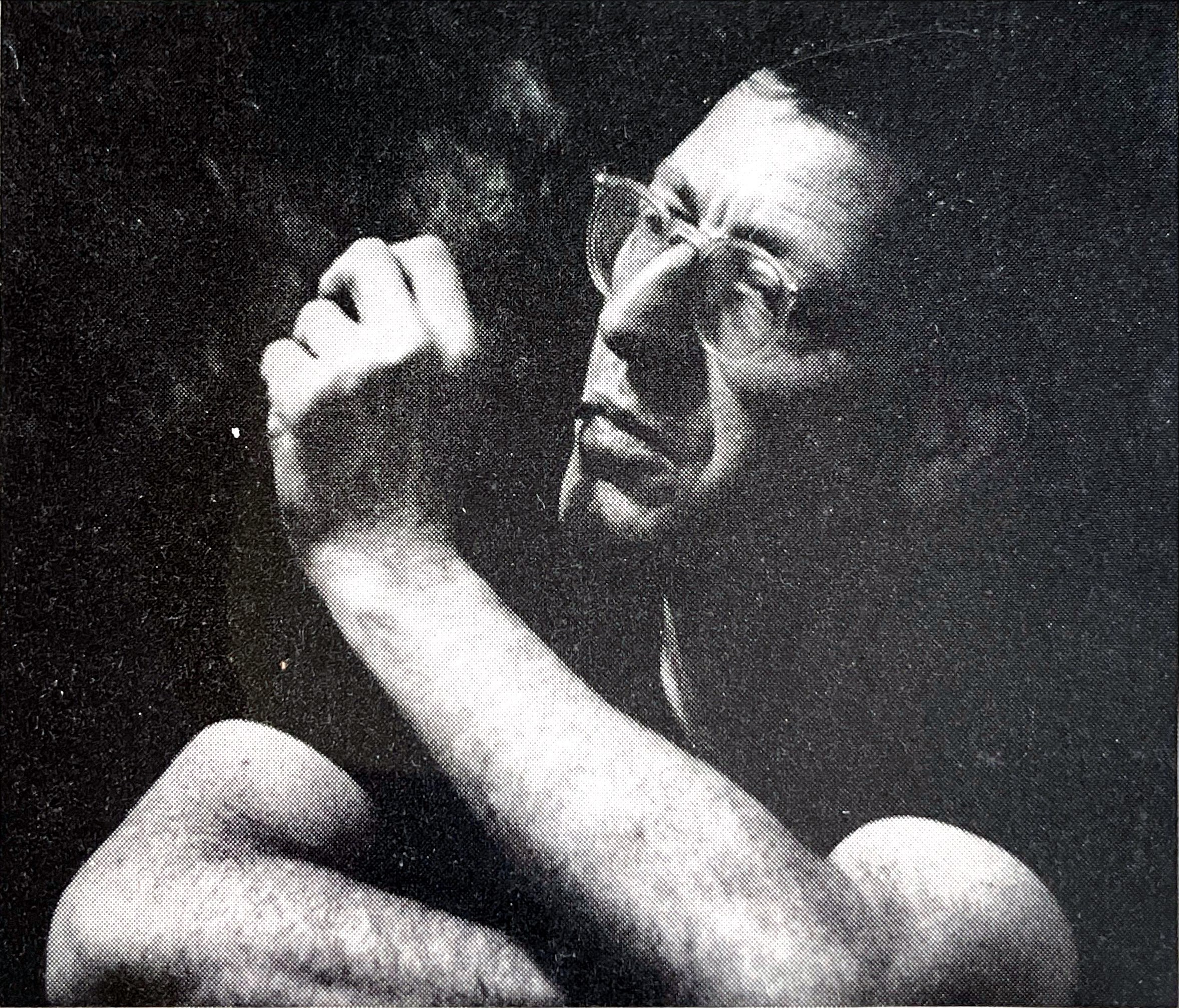
The author, c. 1964
