= New Reformation =

1970 book by Paul Goodman

- First edition
- Author: Paul Goodman
- Subject: Social commentary
- Published: 1970 (Random House)
- Pages: 208
- OCLC: 633058968

New Reformation: Notes of a Neolithic Conservative is a 1970 book of social commentary by Paul Goodman best known as his apologia pro vita sua before his death two years later.

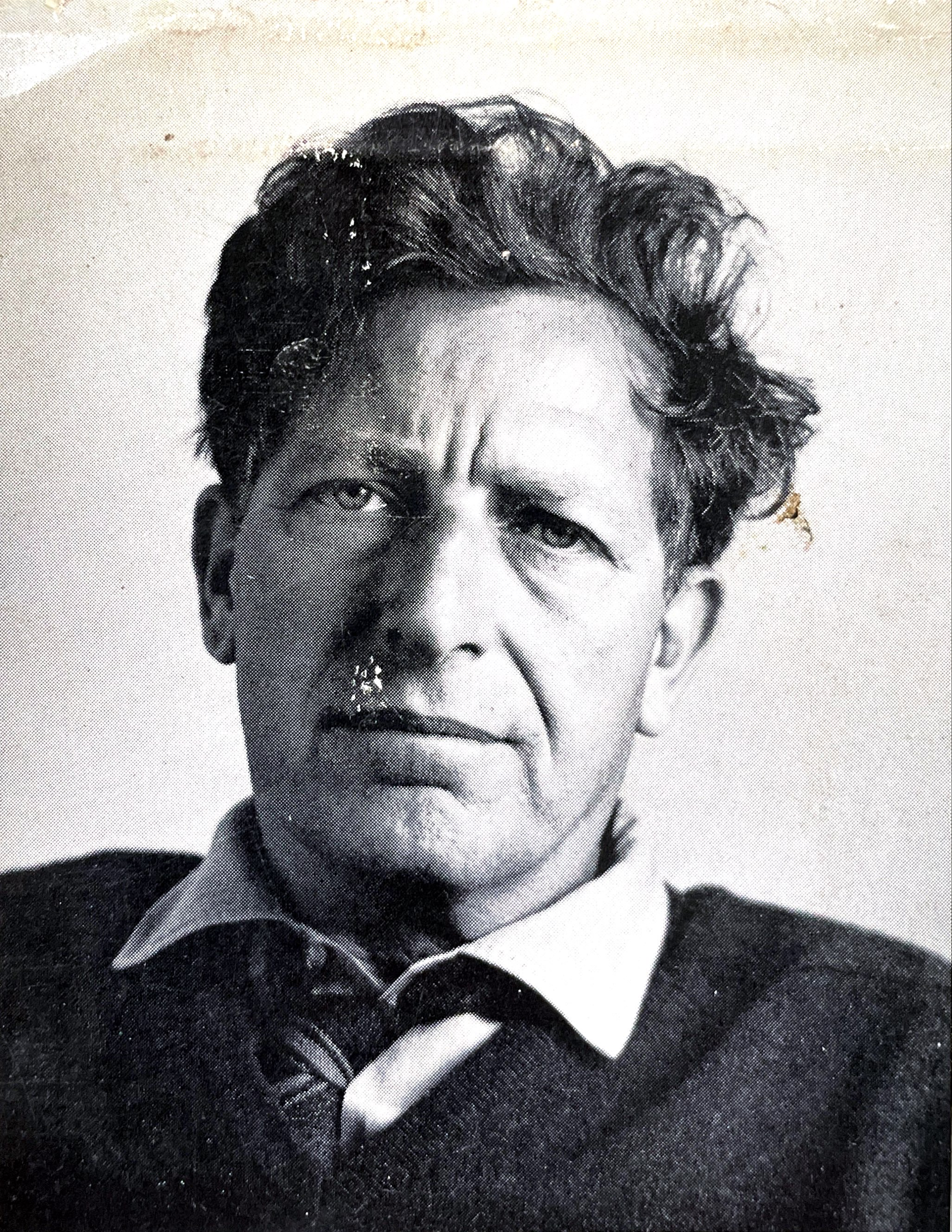
The author, c. 1969

== Synopsis ==
Its first essay addresses misuse of scientific discovery by government. Contending that technology is a type of moral philosophy, not science, he advocates for technologists to advise on the proper use of technology and greater technological decentralization. He promotes reducing cars and encouraging space exploration. Goodman draws a final analogy between his contemporary times and the Protestant Reformation.

The book marked Goodman's schism from the countercultural student movement, which he saw as growing in ignorance and frail ideology, and who saw him as bourgeois.

== Reception and legacy ==
Writing in 2010, author Kerry Howley assessed Goodman's core distrust as having withstood the test of time (i.e., in CIA and FBI hidden government and in major political parties to protect civil liberties and not pursue war). She found his style to overprocess and sabotage ideas he intended to germinate, often extinguishing the joy out of otherwise interesting, subversive thoughts.

== Bibliography ==
- Adams, Phoebe (June 1970). "Rev. of The New Reformation". The Atlantic. 225 (6): 128. ISSN 0160-6506.
- Barnard, Roger (February 1, 1973). "Goodman Observed". New Society. Vol. 23, no. 539. pp. 251–252. ISSN 0028-6729. ProQuest 1307085609.
- Cattani, Richard J. (August 6, 1970). "A Conservative Anarchist Thinks Aloud". The Christian Science Monitor. Boston. p. 13. ISSN 0882-7729. ProQuest 511131534.
- Caws, Peter (May 30, 1970). "On to The Constructive Stage (Rev. of New Reformation)". New Republic. Vol. 162, no. 22. pp. 25–27. ISSN 0028-6583.
- Comeau, Paul J. (2012). "Paul Goodman's Last Testament". Fifth Estate. No. 387. pp. 27–28. ISSN 0015-0800. ProQuest 1027766319.
- Goodheart, Eugene (August 3, 1970). "Unless I Can Think up an Alternative or Two (Rev. of New Reformation)". Nation. 211 (3): 84–86. ISSN 0027-8378.
- Gordon, Jan B. (1970). "Review of New Reformation: Notes of a Neolithic Conservative". The Georgia Review. 24 (4): 513–517. ISSN 0016-8386. JSTOR 41396769.
- Honeywell, Carissa (November 2011). "Rev. of New Reformation". Anarchist Studies. 19 (2): 116–118. ISSN 0967-3393. EBSCOhost 67546227.
- Howley, Kerry (December 2010). "Arrested Development". Bookforum. Vol. 17, no. 4. pp. 22–23, 43. ISSN 1098-3376.
- Kaminsky, James (2006). "Paul Goodman, 30 Years Later: Growing Up Absurd; Compulsory Mis-education, and The Community of Scholars; and The New Reformation—A Retrospective". Teachers College Record. 108 (7): 1339–1361. doi:10.1111/j.1467-9620.2006.00696.x.
- Keniston, Kenneth (September 6, 1970). "Three books that suggest a radical critique of modern America". The New York Times. pp. 3, 20. ISSN 0362-4331.
- Letwin, Shirley Robin (March 3, 1973). "Shirley Robin Letwin on the hero of the Beat Generation (Book Review)". The Spectator. Vol. 230, no. 7549. pp. 266–267. ISSN 0038-6952. ProQuest 1295816703.
- Levine, George (February 18, 1973). "Paul Goodman, Outsider Looking In". The New York Times Book Review. pp. 4–6. ISSN 0362-4331. ProQuest 119671494.
- Resnik, Henry S. (May 23, 1970). "Heretic from the Mass Faith in Scientific Technology (Rev. of New Reformation)". Saturday Review. pp. 43–46. ISSN 0036-4983.
- Schneidau, Herbert N. (November 1970). "Rev. of The New Reformation". Commentary. 50 (5): 99–103. ISSN 0010-2601. ProQuest 1290135994.
- Shimahara, Nobuo (1970). "Goodman's Attempt to Explain Anarchy as a Philosophy of Education". The Phi Delta Kappan. 52 (1): 54–55. ISSN 0031-7217. JSTOR 20372791.
- Yoder, Jr., Edwin M. (June 1970). "Books in Brief (Rev. of New Reformation)". Harper's Magazine. Vol. 240, no. 1441. p. 114. ISSN 0017-789X.
