= Why? Group =

New York anarchist group

The Why? Group published several anarchist magazines in the 1940s and 1950s. Why? An Anarchist Bulletin and its successor, Resistance, ran between 1942 and 1952. Members of the group included Paul Goodman, Dwight Macdonald, Kenneth Rexroth, and Kenneth Patchen. Another magazine, Retort, ran between 1942 and 1947 and was related to the group.
