= Utopian Essays and Practical Proposals =

Book by Paul Goodman

- First edition
- Author: Paul Goodman
- Published: 1962 (Random House)
- Pages: 289
- OCLC: 486411
- LC Class: AC8 G66

Utopian Essays and Practical Proposals is a 1962 book of essays on social issues by Paul Goodman.

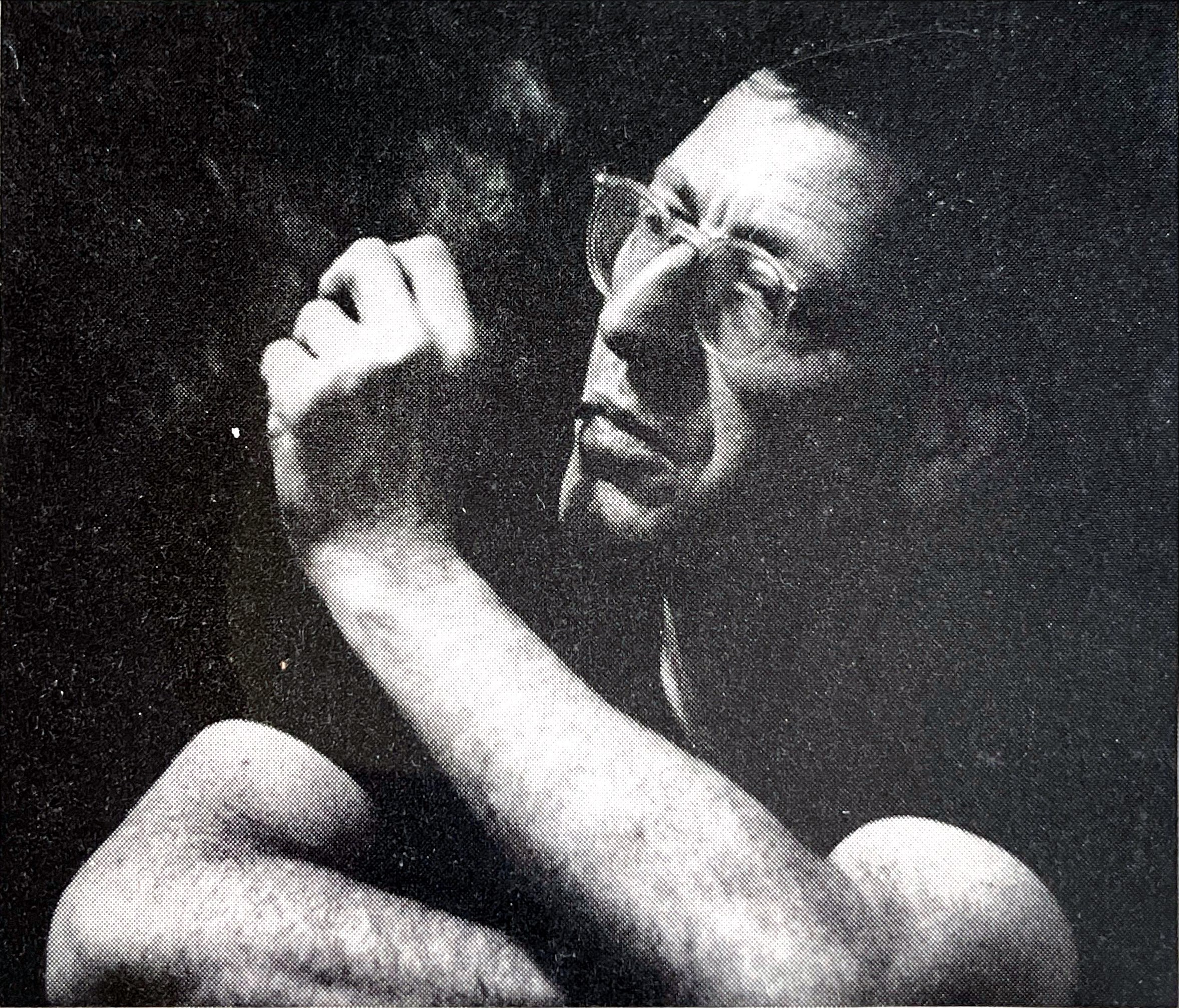
The author, c. 1964
