= Five Years (book) =

1966 book by Paul Goodman

- First edition
- Author: Paul Goodman
- Subject: Autobiography
- Published: 1966 (Brussel & Brussel)
- Pages: 257 pp.
- OCLC: 284500
- LC Class: PS3513 O53 F5

Five Years is an autobiographical collection of Paul Goodman's notebooks between 1955 and 1960.

== Publication ==
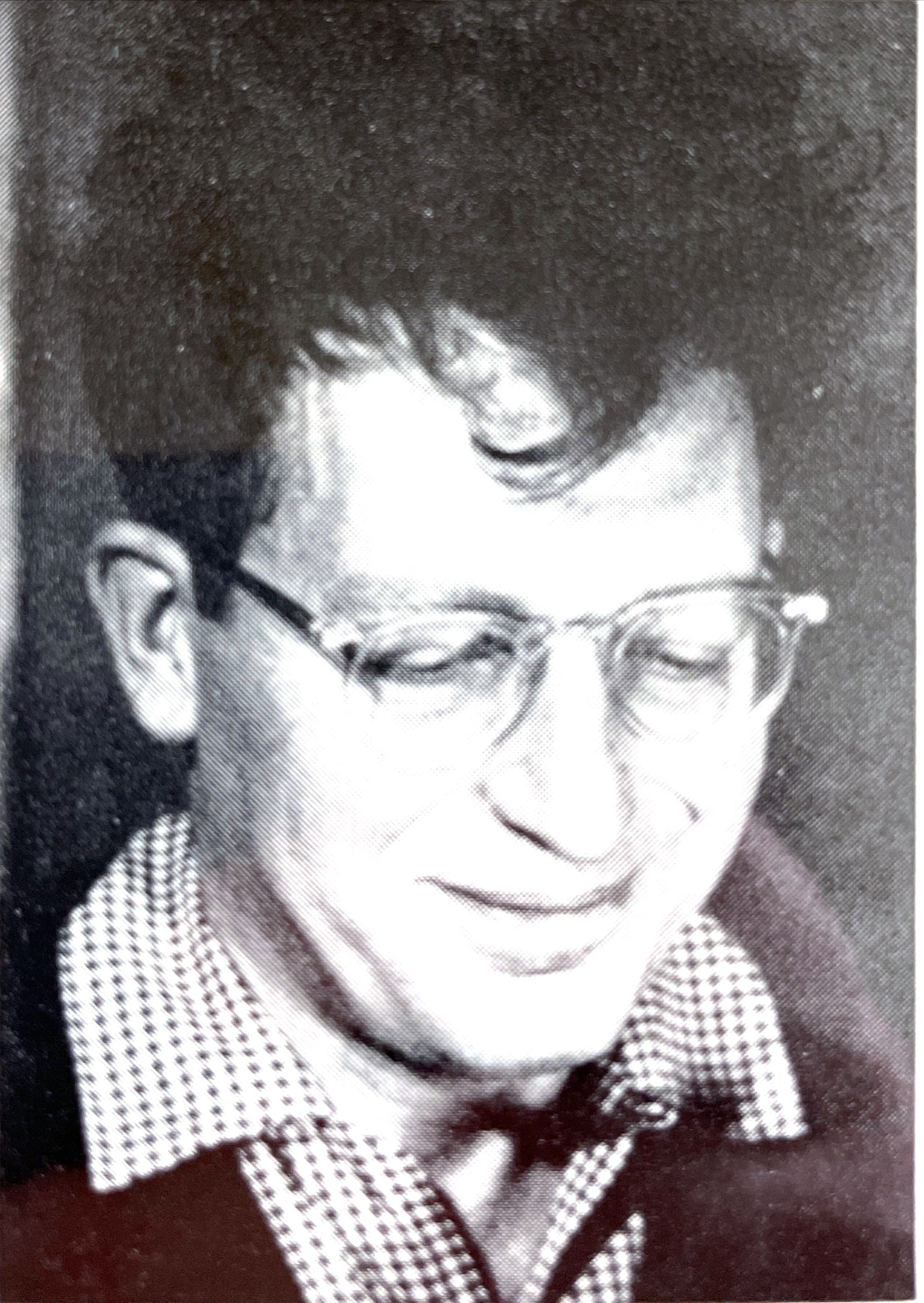
The author, c. 1959, when these notebooks were written

The entries in his original journals were modified for publication. The original journals were acquired from Goodman's wife in 1989 and are held at Harvard University's Houghton Library.
