= Ben Raeburn =

American book publisher (died 1997)

- Died: April 9, 1997 (age 86)
- Occupation: Book publisher
- Known for: Horizon Press

Ben Raeburn was the publisher of Horizon Press, an independent press based in New York from 1951 to 1984.

== Horizon Press ==
Raeburn owned Horizon Press, which was known through the mid-20th century for discovering authors in advance of their mass public appeal and publishing works by known authors with limited commercial appeal. The press was also known for "exquisite" book design. Herbert Mitgang described as legendary Raeburn's ability to perform many of the tasks of publishing, including editing and design, himself.

Horizon published books by Robert Olen Butler a decade in advance of his 1993 Pulitzer Prize. The press published Donald Newlove's nonfiction when other publishers would not. It became a bestseller. Horizon printed Frank Lloyd Wright's complete works and received Publishers Weekly's 1977 Carey-Thomas Award for publishing an autobiography of Wright. Other Horizon books include selections from Oriana Fallaci, Irving Howe, and Alfred Kazin.

Raeburn sold the press in 1984 and it closed soon after.

== Personal life ==
Raeburn was arrested in 1935 on charges of mailing obscene materials as the office manager of Falstaff Press, which was owned by his aunt and uncle. He was convicted in 1939 and imprisoned for two years.

Raeburn was married and had a son. He died of Alzheimer's disease on April 9, 1997, at the age of 86.
