= Little Prayers and Finite Experience =

Book by Paul Goodman

- First edition
- Author: Paul Goodman
- Subject: Poetry, social criticism
- Published: October 11, 1972 (Harper & Row)
- Pages: 124

Little Prayers and Finite Experience is a book of prose and poetry by Paul Goodman.

== Publication ==
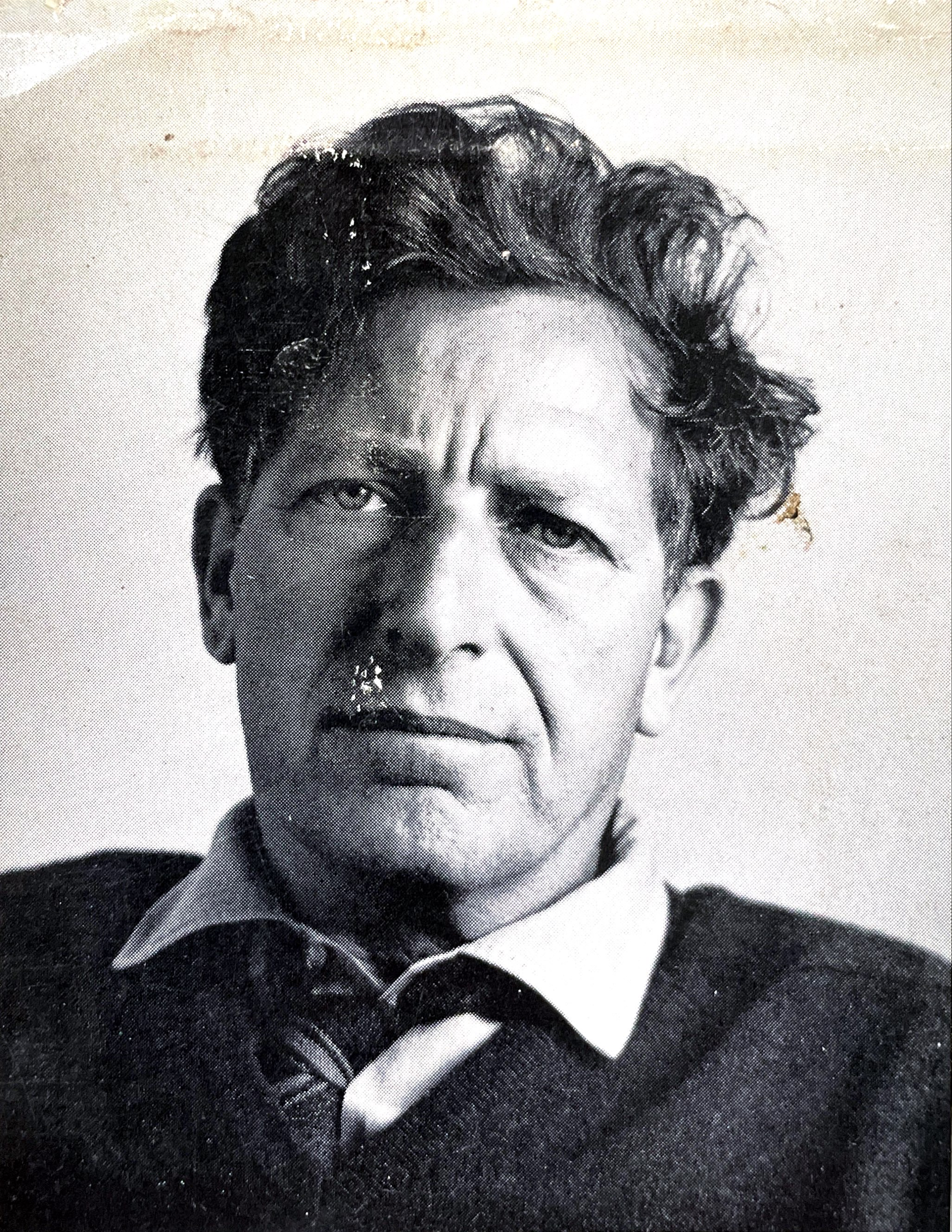
The author, c. 1969

Harper & Row first published 5,000 copies of Little Prayers and Finite Experience on October 11, 1972. Wildwood House distributed its British edition in November 1973.
