= Speaking and Language =

1972 book by Paul Goodman

- First edition
- Author: Paul Goodman
- Subject: Social criticism
- Published: January 1972 (Random House)
- Pages: 242

Speaking and Language: Defence of Poetry is a book of criticism by Paul Goodman that blames academic, structured approaches to linguistics for diminishing the role of creativity and spontaneity in speaking and human nature.

== Publication ==
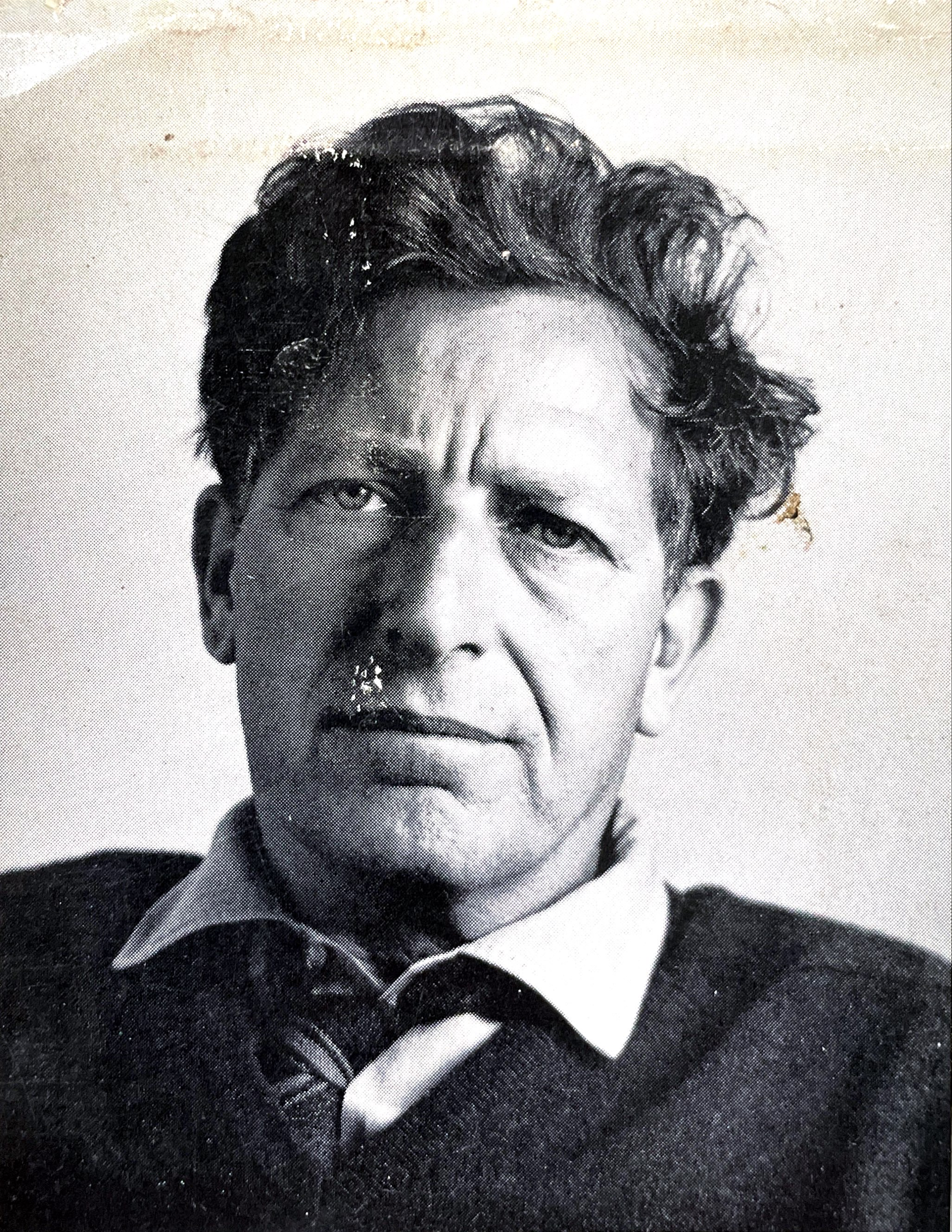
The author, c. 1969

Random House first published the book's hardcover cloth edition in January 1972, though the official publication date had listed November 1971. A paperback edition by Vintage Books followed in August 1972. Speaking and Language released in the United Kingdom in 1973.
