= Collected Poems (Goodman) =

Book of Paul Goodman's poetry

- Author: Paul Goodman
- Subject: Poetry
- Published: January 3, 1974
- Publisher: Random House
- Pages: 467
- ISBN: 0-39448-358-8

Collected Poems is a book of Paul Goodman's collected poetry, edited by his literary executor Taylor Stoehr and introduced by George Dennison.

Ned Rorem, who had set Goodman's poetry to art song, felt that Goodman's revisions had weakened his originals.

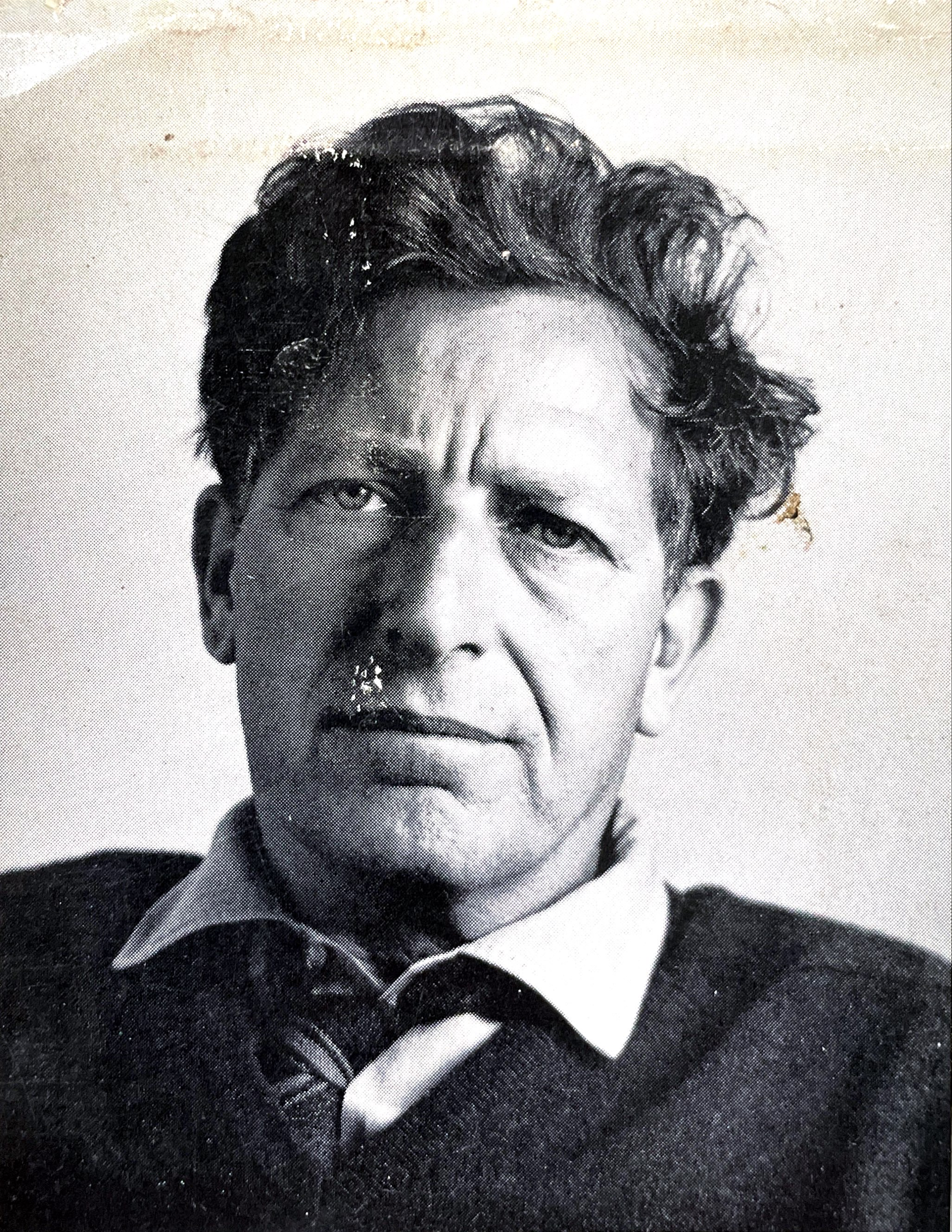
The author, c. 1969
