= The Empire City =

1959 novel by Paul Goodman

- First edition
- Author: Paul Goodman
- Published: 1959 (Bobbs-Merrill)
- Pages: 621

The Empire City is a 1959 epic novel by Paul Goodman.

== Publication ==
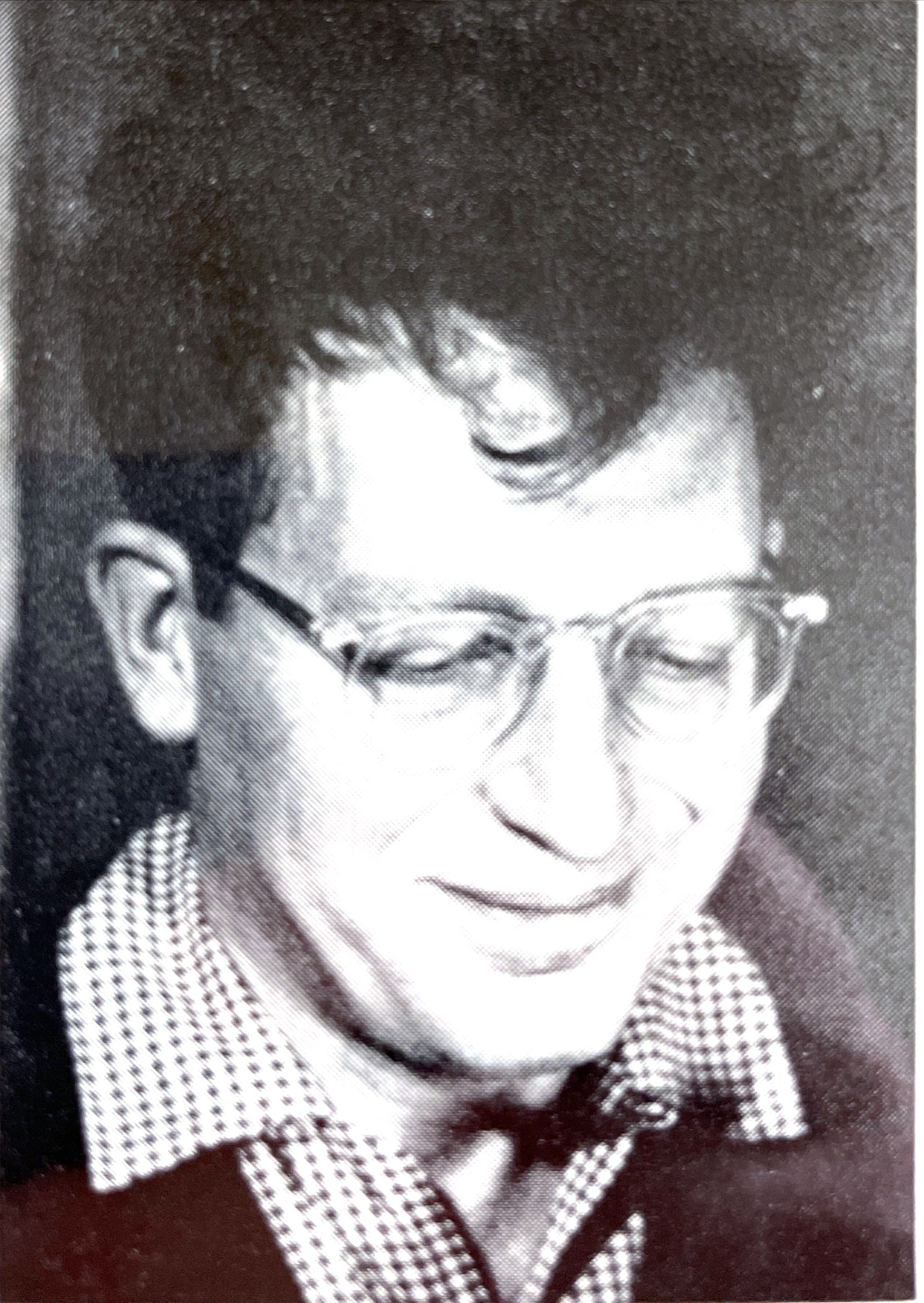
The author as depicted on the book's original dust jacket

Goodman wrote The Empire City over the course of almost 20 years. He began work on his epic, The Empire City, upon returning to New York City in 1939 from his graduate work at the University of Chicago. Throughout his studies and prior to graduate school, Goodman had written poems, plays, and stories, but with a grant in hand to write his dissertation and some monthly money from his mother-in-law, Goodman once again afforded himself a few years to pursue his art before his scholarship. Having been homesick for his native town, the task of his novel was a kind of homecoming. The Grand Piano, which would become the first volume of The Empire City, was published by Colt Press in 1942.

The second volume, The State of Nature, was published by Vanguard Press in 1946. The press had published a book of Goodman's stories the year prior and would publish Goodman's book on Kafka in 1947, but they each sold progressively worse. Withered by World War II and his self-confidence shaken, Goodman began a self-analysis in the style of Freud that culminated in a separate, self-analytic novel. Goodman, who felt most comfortable as an artist, used self-reflexive fiction as a vehicle for self-analysis throughout his life. After finishing the self-analytic novel, Goodman completed the next book of his epic, The Dead of Spring, but publishers (including Vanguard) were uninterested in both, even as Goodman considered The Dead of Spring his best work. Goodman self-published the third volume on David Dellinger's New Jersey pacifist commune press in 1950 after soliciting subscriptions from 200 friends via postcards. He was distraught by the lack of wider interest in his work and bereft of purpose in how his writing could serve either his desire for external validation or his desire to impact change in his fellow man. The Dead of Spring articulated Goodman's great personal dilemma: "If we conformed to the mad society, we became mad; but if we did not conform to the only society that there is, we became mad."

This theme of questioning how to integrate one's self into society recurs throughout Goodman's fourth volume, The Holy Terror, which he wrote in 1952 and 1953. By this time, Goodman was embedded in the nascent world of Gestalt therapy, having co-written its seminal text for publication in 1951. Goodman's characters and their desires reflect the type of relationships the author was exploring as a new therapist. Unlike the prior books, in which Horatio detached himself from the absurd society, in The Holy Terror, Horatio attempts, with mixed success, to integrate into the larger society.

In a later interview, Goodman explained that he would have continued the novel, but the next action for Horatio for which he was looking became Goodman's epochal 1960 work, Growing Up Absurd.

The novel was issued in paperback by Bobbs-Merrill in 1964, at the height of Goodman's fame as a social critic, and later re-issued, posthumously, in 1977, by Vintage, the main publisher of Goodman's political and social works of the sixties; this edition contains an editorial note (concerning the editing of the end of the novel) by one of Goodman's literary executors, Taylor Stoehr, and an illuminating five-page Preface by Goodman's good friend, the critic Harold Rosenberg, who, comparing it to Melville's Mardi, writes that "however one judges 'The Empire City' as a novel, there is no doubt that it is a great book" (Rosenberg xi), noting (and quoting from the book) that "Goodman has the humor, high and low, of a never-failing contradictory intelligence, plus the exuberance of one who has been visited by the animal faith [...] that there are weapons 'that do not weigh one down' and that the lover of life has also on his side 'the force that is in the heart of matter, that, as if stubbornly, makes things exist rather be mere dreams or wishes'" (Rosenberg xi-xii). The book was again later re-issued by Black Sparrow Press, with a long introduction by Stoehr, in 2000.

== Reception ==
Richard Kostelanetz described The Empire City as Goodman's most impressive fiction, mainly in its conception and not its execution.

Academic Theodore Roszak wrote in 1967 that, among Goodman's works, The Empire City was the most likely to endure. He described the book as a social-philosophical existential sociology of American society that combines elements of novel, pamphlet, treatise, and reportage as Goodman's "running commentary on the steep American ascent to Empire as seen from the vantage point of a tiny communitarian circle surviving by its wits and the public welfare in megapolitan New York".

The Encyclopedia of Gay Histories and Cultures described it as a "neglected masterpiece of experimental fiction" and "a key link between surrealist and postmodern writing".

== Volumes ==
1. The Grand Piano or, The Almanac of Alienation (1942, Colt Press)
2. The State of Nature (1946, Vanguard Press)
3. The Dead of Spring (1950, Libertarian Press)
4. The Holy Terror (together published as The Empire City, 1959, Bobbs-Merrill)

== Bibliography ==
- Roszak, Theodore (1969). "Exploring Utopia: The Visionary Sociology of Paul Goodman". The Making of a Counter Culture: Reflections on the Technocratic Society and Its Youthful Opposition. Garden City, New York: Doubleday. pp. 178–204. OCLC 23039.
- Stoehr, Taylor (1994). Here Now Next: Paul Goodman and the Origins of Gestalt Therapy. San Francisco: Jossey-Bass. ISBN 978-0-7879-0005-2. OCLC 30029013.
