= Like a Conquered Province =

- First edition
- Author: Paul Goodman
- Subject: Social criticism
- Published: May 1967 (Random House)
- Pages: 142
- OCLC: 712336
- LC Class: E169.1 G66

External audio
- Goodman's 1966 Massey Lecture audio in six parts

Like a Conquered Province: The Moral Ambiguity of America is a book of Paul Goodman's Massey Lectures for the Canadian Broadcasting Corporation on topics of American pathologies, in particular, citizens not taking responsibility for the consequences of inequality and harmful technologies. He advocates for decentralized alternatives to existing institutions that give greater control to individuals.

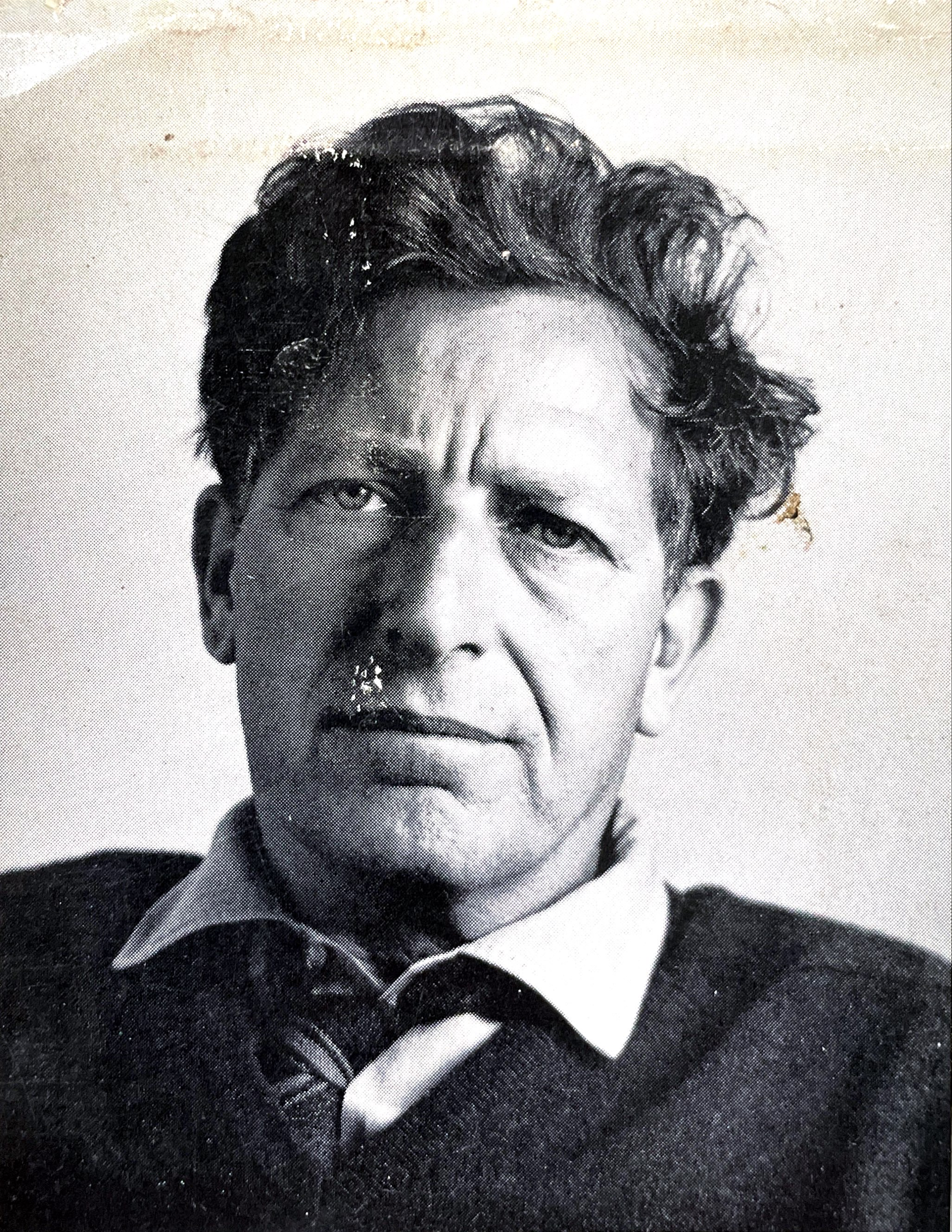
The author, c. 1969

== Publication ==
Vintage Books published a dual paperback edition in February 1968 combining Like a Conquered Province with People or Personnel. Like a Conquered Province's paperback appendices reprint eight Goodman essays from 1967: "Three Letters to Decision-Makers" (Liberation), "What Is American?" (Liberation), "The Education Industries" (Harvard Educational Review), "Muste's Nonviolence" (under a different title in Liberation), "We Won't Go" (The New York Review of Books) "Rural Life: 1984" (under a different title in Ramparts), "A Causerie at the Military-Industrial" (The New York Review of Books).

== Bibliography ==
- Nicely, Tom (1979). Adam and His Work: A Bibliography of Sources by and about Paul Goodman (1911–1972). Metuchen, NJ: Scarecrow Press. ISBN 978-0-8108-1219-2. OCLC 4832535.
