= Taylor Stoehr =

American professor and author

- Born: 1931
- Died: September 14, 2013 (aged 81–82)
- Occupation: Professor
- Known for: Edited works by Paul Goodman

Taylor Stoehr (1931–2013) was an American professor and author. He edited several volumes of Paul Goodman's work as his literary executor.

== Works ==
- Dickens: The Dreamer's Stance (1965)
- Hawthorne's Mad Scientists: Pseudoscience and Social Science (1978)
- Nay-Saying in Concord: Emerson, Alcott, and Thoreau (1979)
- Here Now Next: Paul Goodman and the Origins of Gestalt Therapy (1994)

Edited

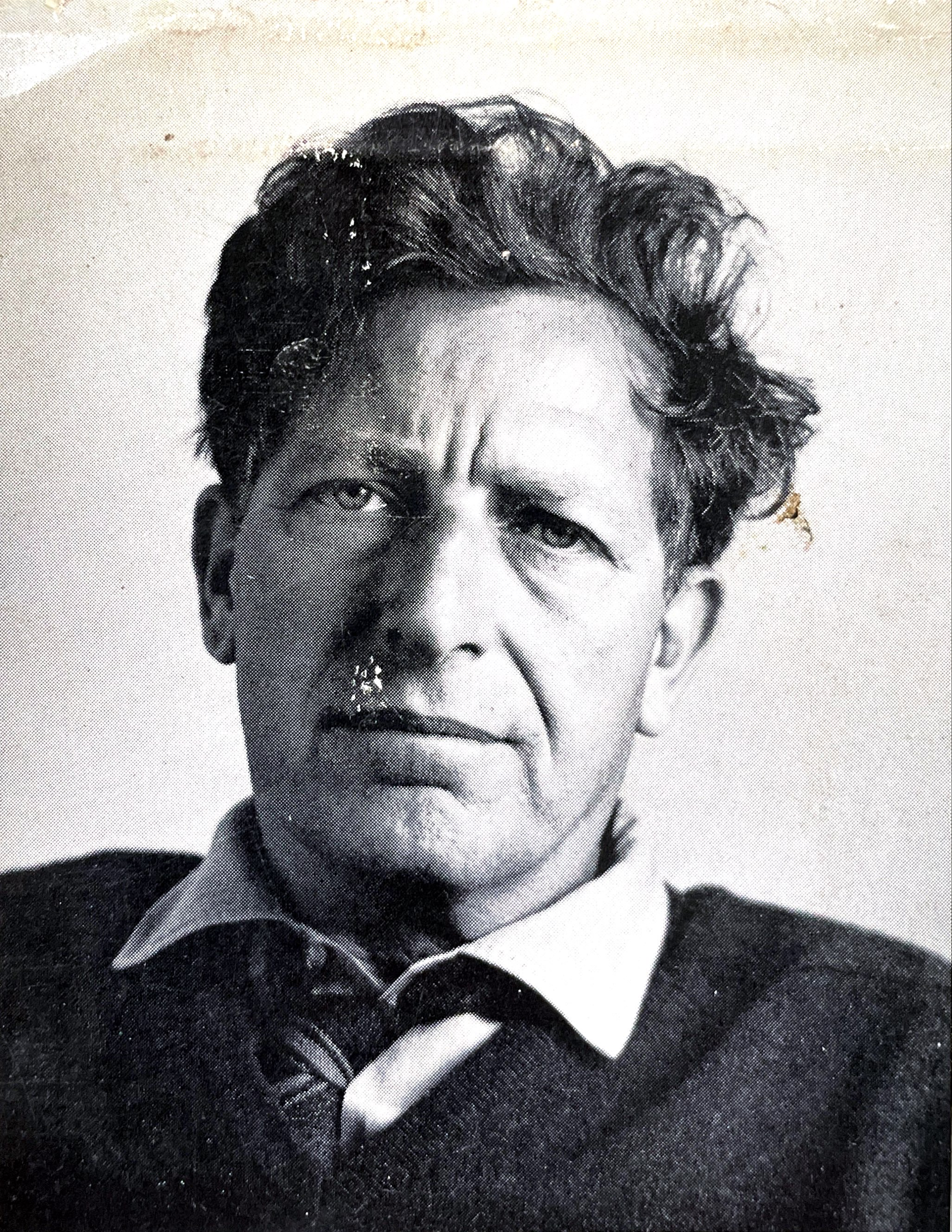
Stoehr was the literary executor for Paul Goodman (pictured)

- Paul Goodman's Collected Poems (1976)
- Drawing the Line: The Political Essays of Paul Goodman (1977)
- Creator Spirit Come: The Literary Essays of Paul Goodman (1977)
- Nature Heals: The Psychological Essays of Paul Goodman (1977)
- The Collected Stories of Paul Goodman (1978–1980, four volumes)
- Crazy Hope & Finite Experience: Final Essays of Paul Goodman (1994)
- Decentralizing Power: Paul Goodman's Social Criticism (1994)
- Format & Anxiety: Paul Goodman Critiques the Media (1995)
- The Paul Goodman Reader (2011)
