= Kingsley Widmer =

American literary critic

- Born: July 17, 1925
- Died: February 19, 2009 (aged 83)

Kingsley Widmer (1925–2009) was an American literary critic.

== Life and career ==
Kingsley Widmer was born in Minneapolis on July 17, 1925 and raised in the midwest. He attended the University of Wisconsin and finished his bachelor's degree (1949) and master's (1951) at the University of Minnesota. Widmer completed his doctorate at the University of Washington in 1957. He was a Ford Foundation humanities intern at Reed College in Oregon in 1955 and continued there as an instructor until 1956, when he joined the English faculty of San Diego State College. He became a full professor there in 1967.

Widmer was a visiting professor at UC Berkeley (1960–1961), Simon Fraser University (1967), the University of Nice (1970), SUNY Buffalo (1974), the University of Tulsa (1975, 1976, 1978), and taught literature at universities in Minnesota and Washington as well. He lectured on American literature at Tel Aviv University as a Fulbright scholar in 1963–1964.

== Works ==
- Literary Censorship (1961, Wadsworth, with wife Eleanor Widmer)
- The Art of Perversity: D. H. Lawrence's Shorter Fictions (1962, University of Washington Press)
- Henry Miller: A Critical Study (1963, Twayne, revised 1990)
- The Literary Rebel (1965, Southern Illinois University Press)
- The Experience of Freedom: Censorship and the Teacher (1966, American Federation of Teachers)
- The Ways of Nihilism: A Study of Herman Melville's Short Novels (1970, Ward Ritchie)
- The End of Culture: Essays on Sensibility in Contemporary Society (1975, San Diego State University Press)
- Edges of Extremity: Some Problems of Literary Modernism (1980, University of Tulsa)
- Paul Goodman (1980, Twayne)
- Nathanael West (1982, Twayne)
- Counterings: Utopian Dialectics in Contemporary Contexts (1988, University of Michigan)
- Defiant Desire: Some Dialectical Legacies of D. H. Lawrence (1992, Southern Illinois University Press)

== Personal life ==
Widmer married and had two children. He was an infantryman in the U.S. Army during World War II and an anarchist.
