= The Structure of Literature =

1954 book by Paul Goodman

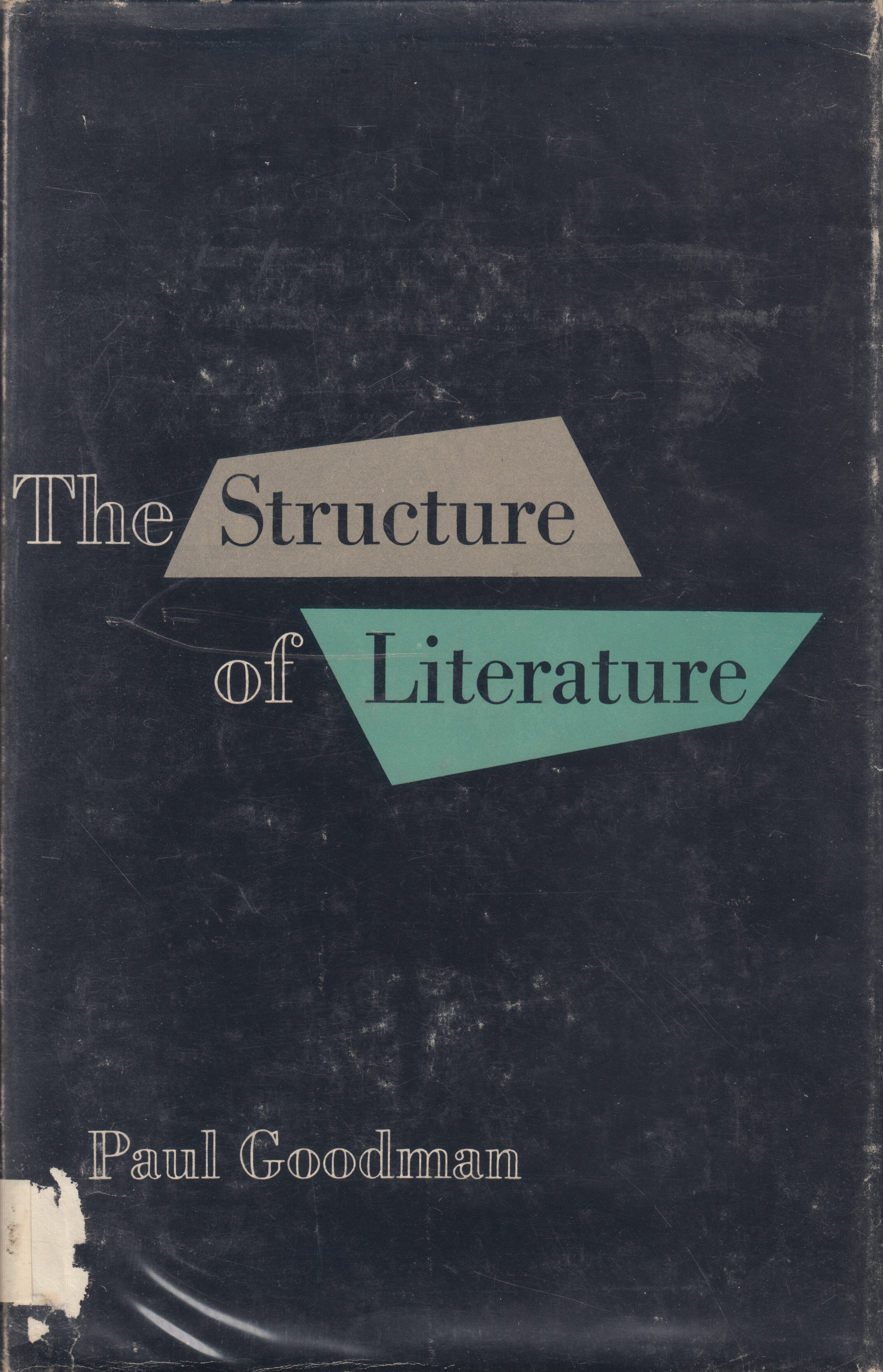
- First edition
- Author: Paul Goodman
- Subject: Literary criticism
- Published: April 30, 1954
- Publisher: University of Chicago Press
- Pages: 282
- OCLC: 233320
- LC Class: PN45 G63

The Structure of Literature is a 1954 book of literary criticism by Paul Goodman, the published version of his doctoral dissertation in the humanities. The book proposes a mode of formal literary analysis that Goodman calls "inductive formal analysis": Goodman defines a formal structure within an isolated literary work, finds how parts of the work interact with each other to form a whole, and uses those definitions to study other works. Goodman analyzes multiple literary works as examples with close reading and genre discussion.

The main points of Goodman's dissertation were made in a 1934 article on aesthetics by the author, who studied with the philosopher Richard McKeon and other neo-Aristotelians at the University of Chicago. Goodman finished his dissertation in 1940, but it was published only in 1954 by the University of Chicago Press at McKeon's behest. Reviews aggregated in Book Review Digest were mixed. Critics described the book as falling short of its aims, with engaging psychological insight and incisive asides mired in glaring style issues and jargon that made passages impenetrable or obscured his argument. Though Goodman contributed to the development of what became known as the University of Chicago's Chicago School of Aristotelian formal literary criticism, he neither received wide academic recognition for his dissertation nor had his method accepted by his field.

== Background and publication ==
The Structure of Literature is a work of literary criticism, a genre of humanistic intellectual discussions on the aesthetics of literature. The author, Paul Goodman, identifies as a man of letters, referring to the belles lettres intellectual tradition that descended into the professionalized, academic format known as literary criticism. He trained in this academic tradition. In The Structure of Literature, Goodman practices formal literary analysis, an approach in which he breaks a work into its parts and describes how those parts interrelate to collectively form a whole and create meaning.

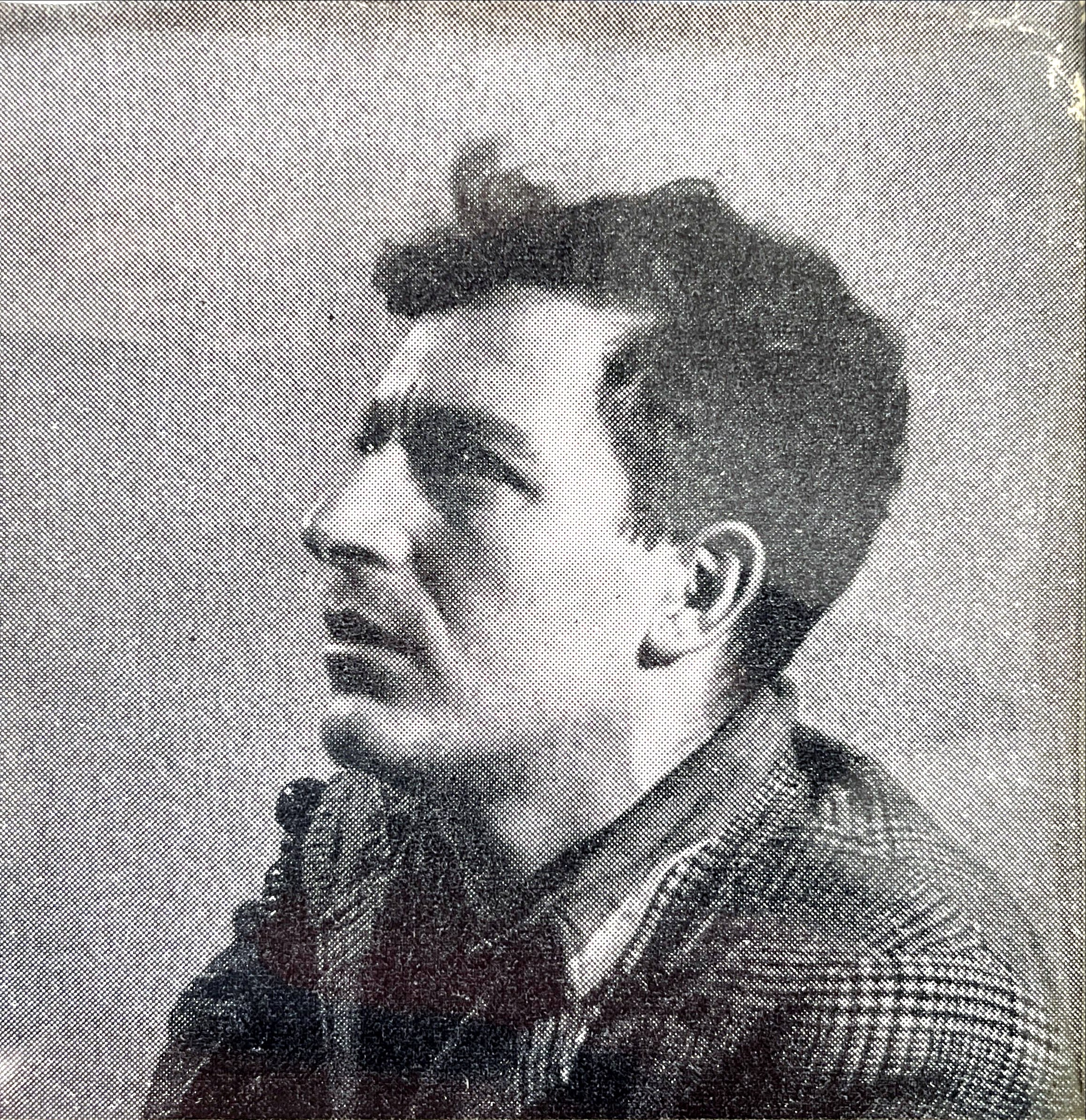
The author in the late 1940s

In the early 1930s, Goodman informally audited Columbia University classes taught by philosopher Richard McKeon. When McKeon became a dean at the University of Chicago, Goodman accompanied him and became a humanities graduate student. McKeon was a central figure of what became known as the neo-Aristotelian Chicago School of literary criticism, despite not identifying as a Aristotelian himself. In an interview, Goodman said that he had been brought to Chicago to work on aesthetics and came to write on practical criticism and Aristotelian poetics. The Chicago School neo-Aristotelians were not a consistent school of thought but shared a common interest in (1) the history of literary theory, (2) the methodology and terminology of Aristotle's Poetics, and (3) skepticism towards the New Criticism movement. The Chicago Aristotelians emphasized categorical elements of a literary work, such as plot and genre.

Goodman finished his doctoral dissertation by 1940, yet did not file it or receive his formal degree for over a decade, being unwilling to pay for its typesetting. The dissertation, The Formal Analysis of Poems, compiled studies Goodman had written for courses on criticism and the analysis of ideas. It took until 1954 for him to receive his degree, when the university accepted a copy of the newly titled The Structure of Literature in lieu of the dissertation's typescript. The central points of this late dissertation, according to literary critic Kingsley Widmer, were published in Goodman's 1934 article on aesthetics in The Journal of Philosophy.

McKeon and Benjamin Nelson, another Chicago professor, convinced the University of Chicago Press to publish the dissertation. Goodman revised the published edition to include new academic material, including a section from Goodman's 1947 analysis of the works of novelist Franz Kafka and a glossary. The University of Chicago Press published a cloth hardback edition on April 30, 1954. A paperback edition from the Press's Phoenix Books imprint followed in 1962, as did a Spanish translation from Siglo XXI in 1971. The book is dedicated to Goodman's teachers: Richard McKeon, Rudolf Carnap, and Morris Cohen.

== Contents ==
Goodman's book seeks to create and demonstrate a method of literary analysis that he calls "inductive formal analysis". By this method, Goodman defines a formal structure within an isolated literary work, finding how parts of the work interact with each other to form a whole, and uses those definitions to study other works. The book applies this method to a series of individual literary works (plays, poems, verse, novels, short stories, and film) as examples, using a combination of close reading and genre discussion. Goodman restricts his technical approach to how the parts within the work's structure interact, and avoids making value judgments of the works themselves, apart from describing "bad" literature as not integrating its parts. He discusses subtleties within a literary work such as a "hidden plot" (i.e., hidden to the protagonist) and the involvement of characters, followed by how those elements work or do not work together. His analysis considers each work's independent structure.

The first chapter differentiates "inductive formal analysis" from other methods of formal criticism. He names two other types: "genre criticism", in which a critic defines and classifies structural elements of a literary work, and "practical criticism", in which a critic interprets a work without invoking traits external to the work. Goodman's "inductive formal analysis" method is meant to balance the two by studying the parts of a work and deriving definitions that can be used across works, i.e. how the parts interrelate to form a whole. He puts particular emphasis on narrative plot, or the elements that continue or change during the work. Throughout the book, he applies his formal analysis to examples of literary works organized by Aristotelian abstract genres: "serious plots", "comic plots", "novelistic plots", "considerations of diction", and "special problems of unity".

The next three chapters describe literary works in three plot types: serious, comic, and novelistic. These types extend from the typology in Aristotle's Poetics. Goodman begins by using two plays by Sophocles—Oedipus Rex and Philoctetes—to distinguish Aristotle's method from Goodman's own. He argues that Aristotle's method is modelled on the formal structure of Oedipus Rex and that this structure is inadequate to apply to Philoctetes. Instead, in Goodman's "serious plot" typology, the characters are intertwined with and indistinguishable from the plot, such as in Shakespeare's play Richard II and Virgil's epic poem, the Aeneid. Characters in Goodman's "comic plots" are further removed from the plot so the reader is less affected by the character's destruction, such as Ben Jonson's play The Alchemist. He also describes Shakespeare's Henry IV, Part 1 and John Dryden's verse satire Mac Flecknoe as a mix of comic and serious plots. In "novelistic plots", the characters respond to rather than identify with the plot, with examples including Gustav Flaubert's novel Sentimental Education, Franz Kafka's novel The Castle, and Shakespeare's Hamlet.

In the fifth chapter, Goodman analyzes lyrical poems into elements such as feeling, reflection/thinking, image, and stylistic attitude. Although these elements appear in long-form works, Goodman contends that they are subordinate to larger structural elements like character, plot, and thesis in those works. He performs a close reading of John Milton's "On His Blindness" and Lord Tennyson's "Morte d'Arthur", with formal analysis of "texture" elements like word sound, weight, syntax, tone, and metaphor. He introduces six potential ways to relate sonnet stanzas and what they infer. Goodman also analyzes the verse Catullus 46.

The sixth chapter addresses "special problems of unity", i.e., unique circumstances for when analysis extends beyond a single work, such as unifying the structure of a work's translation with its original. In the first of four examples, Goodman discusses how the heavy symbolism Nathaniel Hawthorne's short story "The Minister's Black Veil" sublimates into mystery. In the examples of a translation of Baudelaire's sonnet "La Géante" and a film adaptation of Eugène Labiche's play Un Chapeau de Paille d'Italie, Goodman notes how formal elements change within transformations of works, such that character, rhythm, syntax, theme, and other elements change from the original format. In the example of "La Géante", Goodman concludes that the sonnet and its translation differ in genre. He also cites Henry Wadsworth Longfellow's "The Builders" as a demonstration of a good poet's ability to write bad poems.

Goodman ends with an analysis of Pierre Corneille's 17th-century tragedy Horace that uses his inductive formal method alongside other critical modes to highlight the play's psychology of war. He criticizes Corneille's decision to not portray the real atrocities of war.

== Reception ==
Reviews listed in Book Review Digest were of mixed favor and disfavor. In his glossary section, Goodman acknowledges that his term definitions are wide and unspecific, and that the reader will find that either annoying or entertaining. The poet Nicholas Moore wrote that this effect on the reader extends to the lively book as whole: irritating or amusing in style, with a persuasive, painstaking scholar underneath.

Critics described the method as falling short of its aims. Based on Goodman's applied examples, philosopher Henry David Aiken did not believe that "inductive formal analysis" constituted a new type of analysis. Literary critic Harry Levin agreed that the method had no "special light to cast" and the poet Nicholas Moore said, despite describing the book as a "tour de force", that Goodman had not entirely fulfilled his argument. Goodman's psychological insight and "incisive asides" engaged some reviewers, but as one critic put it, they were the insights of a poet and outsider rather than of a theorist. As Books Abroad wrote, these striking asides became lost in Goodman's attempts to create an Aristotelian analytic method.

In The Structure of Literature, Goodman repeatedly concedes that he is abstracting structures within the work rather than probing for the meaning of the text itself. As a result of processing literary works into highly technical abstractions, critics wrote of his analysis being reduced to vague generalities. As literary critic Kingsley Widmer reasoned, Goodman neglected his best perceptions as digressions rather than as the centerpiece of his analysis. Widmer saw Goodman's method as objectifying "wrong judgments" about "form" and "structure" into uncorrectable "abstracted schematisms". Goodman's method, said Levin, redefines concepts like "God" or "sin" by their structural use within a work, like a kind of "literary behaviorism" that produces categories ultimately more conceptual than artistic or formal. The reviewer found Goodman to be more interested in his schematism than his subject's technique. Widmer considered Goodman's approach to be unoriginal, as "earnest genre applications of ... stock neo-Aristotelian abstractions". Critic Elmer Borklund recommended the Aristotelian method of R. S. Crane and Elder Olson instead.

Reviewers remarked on glaring style issues in Goodman's own text: with "a certain aridity and addiction to jargon", and "dizzying and not always grammatical shifts from the gnomic to the off-hand", lacking both in grace and basic clarity as Goodman's style obscured his argument. One critic found some passages impenetrable due to style issues, requiring the reader to mentally rewrite sentences to understand Goodman's intention and making the reader doubt otherwise straightforward sentences. As Books Abroad put it, the "application of his theory is rather hopelessly lost in a critical apparatus so elaborate that it requires a glossary". Goodman's case for formalism, wrote Poetry, required better rhetoric. The Kenyon Review said that Goodman's "odd ... pretentiousness" detracted from his argument and made his own writing look bad by his own standard. Reviewers described a text rife with neologisms and jargon, in which special terms mask otherwise facile or redundant points and simple words become technical jargon. The author's tone, wrote the Times Literary Supplement, frequently swaps between "high-falutin' critical terminology" and "quite excessively American colloquialisms".

Among Goodman's analyses of individual texts, some stood out to reviewers. Two praised his analyses of the translation of Baudelaire's "La Géante", particularly when he focused less on structure and wrote with greater clarity. The Times Literary Supplement complimented Goodman's Catullus analysis, but Levin said his reading had no textual basis. Widmer considered Goodman's metrical analysis to be hackneyed and beyond the scope of his method. Reviewers criticized some of Goodman's plot definitions as being "unfitting", "imprecise", "circularly defined", or "lacking consistency or rigor in their application". For instance, although Goodman defines Oedipus and Philoctetes as serious plots, one reviewer wrote that the two are so disparate in final effects that the categorization loses its definitional value.

== Legacy ==
The poet Jackson Mac Low wrote that Goodman was a crucial contributor to the development of Aristotelian formal criticism at the University of Chicago at the turn of the 1940s, which became known as the "Chicago School" affiliated with Richard McKeon and R. S. Crane. In an interview, Goodman credited himself with having created the Aristotelian poetics synonymous with the Chicago School. Goodman had hoped that his dissertation's long-awaited publication would bring academic recognition, but it did not, nor was his method accepted by the wider field. The same applied to Chicago Aristotelianism as a whole, whose methodology saw minimal adoption. In overall summary of Goodman's several works of literary criticism, the literary critic Kingsley Widmer wrote that each book had a different focus, whether psychoanalysis, polemic, or apologia, each with a sense of "unseriousness". Goodman later wrote four "Cubist plays" in which he meant to illustrate the ideas of his dissertation by making characters into archetypes and abstracting its use of plot.

== Bibliography ==
- Aiken, Henry David (1955). "Inductive Criticism". The Kenyon Review. 17 (2): 304–311. ISSN 0163-075X. JSTOR 4333577.
- Borklund, Elmer (1977). "Paul Goodman". Contemporary Literary Critics. Contemporary Writers of the English Language. New York: St. Martin's Press. pp. 226–231. ISBN 978-0-333-22667-4.
- Coffman, Stanley K. (1955). "Review of The Structure of Literature". Books Abroad. 29 (2): 225. doi:10.2307/40094360. ISSN 0006-7431. JSTOR 40094360.
- Greacen, Robert (1955). "Stream of Consciousness in the Modern Novel; The Structure of Literature". English: Journal of the English Association. 10 (60): 232. doi:10.1093/english/10.60.232. ISSN 0013-8215.
- Grever, Glenn (1985). "Too Good to Miss". The English Journal. 74 (5): 77–78. doi:10.2307/817711. ISSN 0013-8274. JSTOR 817711.
- Joost, Nicholas (1954). "Review of The Structure of Literature". Poetry. 84 (6): 365–366. ISSN 0032-2032. JSTOR 20585431.
- Levin, Harry (1955). "Review of The Structure of Literature". Modern Language Notes. 70 (2): 124–126. doi:10.2307/3040659. ISSN 0149-6611. JSTOR 3040659.
- Moore, Nicholas (October 22, 1954). "A Peculiar Act". The Times Literary Supplement (2751): 674. ISSN 0307-661X.
- "New Books in Brief". The Nation. 178: 469. May 29, 1954. ISSN 0027-8378.
- Nicely, Tom (1979). Adam and His Work: A Bibliography of Sources by and about Paul Goodman (1911–1972). Metuchen, NJ: Scarecrow Press. ISBN 978-0-8108-1219-2. OCLC 4832535.
- Rodway, A. E. (1955). "A Critical Technocrat". Essays in Criticism. 5 (1): 55–63. doi:10.1093/eic/V.1.55. ISSN 0014-0856.
- Stoehr, Taylor (1994). Here Now Next: Paul Goodman and the Origins of Gestalt Therapy. San Francisco: Jossey-Bass. ISBN 978-0-7879-0005-2. OCLC 30029013.
- Turner, Robert Y. (1954). "Aristotle with a Difference". Chicago Review. 8 (2): 117–121. doi:10.2307/25293050. ISSN 0009-3696. JSTOR 25293050.
- Vince, Ronald W. (1993). "Neo-Aristotelian or Chicago School". In Makaryk, Irena R. (ed.). Encyclopedia of Contemporary Literary Theory: Approaches, Scholars, Terms. Toronto: University of Toronto Press. pp. 116–120. ISBN 978-0-8020-6860-6.
- Widmer, Kingsley (1980). Paul Goodman. Boston: Twayne. ISBN 0-8057-7292-8.
