= Journal of Narrative Theory =

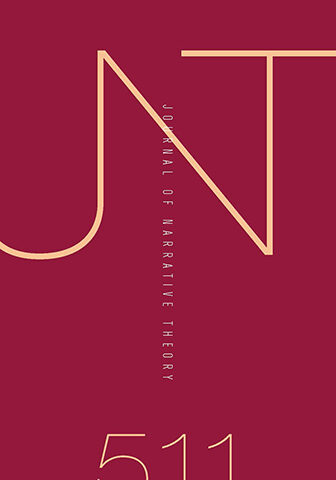
- Discipline: English literature
- Language: English
- Edited by: Abby Coykendall, Andrea Kaston Tange

Publication details
- Former name(s): The Journal of Narrative Technique
- History: 1971-present
- Publisher: Eastern Michigan University (United States)
- Frequency: Triannually

Standard abbreviations
- ISO 4: J. Narrat. Theory

Indexing
- ISSN: 1549-0815 (print); 1548-9248 (web)
- LCCN: sn99047333
- OCLC no.: 231790013

Links
- Journal homepage; Online archive

The Journal of Narrative Theory is a triannual peer-reviewed academic journal covering narratology in literary fiction. The journal was established in 1971 as The Journal of Narrative Technique and obtained its current title in 1999. It is published by the Department of English at Eastern Michigan University and the editors-in-chief are Abby Coykendall and Andrea Kaston Tange. In An Introduction to Narratology, Monika Fludernik lists it as one of "the most important journals in the field".

== History ==
The Journal of Narrative Technique was founded in 1971 by the Eastern Michigan University Department of English and published by the Eastern Michigan University Press. The journal published papers that focused on the authorial management of narrative elements, drawing subject matter from all periods and genres of English literature, including prose and verse.

The Journal of Narrative Technique was the official journal of the Society for the Study of Narrative Literature from the society's founding in 1985 until 1993. George Perkins, the journal's editor since its establishment in 1971, and Barbara Perkins, its managing editor since 1977, initiated the founding of the society in 1984. They became concerned with the lack of financial support for The Journal of Narrative Theory by Eastern Michigan University as the journal's scope widened and the volume and quality of its submissions increased.

In 1991, the Society for the Study of Narrative Literature members removed references to The Journal of Narrative Technique as the society's official journal and gave the society the authority to designate a new official journal. George Perkins approached the Ohio State University Press about founding a new journal with James Phelan as editor. In 1991, the new journal, to be called Narrative, was designated to replace The Journal of Narrative Technique as the Society for the Study of Narrative Literature's official journal. The final issue of The Journal of Narrative Technique as the official journal of the Society for the Study of Narrative Literature was published in Fall 1992, after which George and Barbara Perkins left their posts at The Journal of Narrative Technique to serve as associate editors for Narrative, with Paul Bruss taking over as The Journal of Narrative Technique's general editor and Ian Wojcik-Andrews as its managing editor. The first issue of Narrative was published in January 1993.

In the Winter 1999 issue, co-editors Craig Dionne and Ian Wojcik-Andrews announced a change in the journal's title from The Journal of Narrative Technique to the Journal of Narrative Theory. The title change reflected the variety of new critical perspectives affecting contributors and readers over the preceding five years; emphasizing theory over technique expanded the journal's "interpretive boundaries to include more broadly historical and cultural influences of narrative." The staff and institutional affiliation remained unchanged.
