= Narrative (disambiguation) =

A narrative is an account of events or experiences.

Narrative may also refer to:

- Political narrative, a term used in the humanities and political sciences
- Personal narrative, a prose narrative relating personal experience
- Narrative Magazine, a digital literary magazine
- Narrative (journal), a literary journal published by the Ohio State University
- The Narrative, an American indie rock band
  - The Narrative (album), the band's self-titled album

== See also ==
- Narratology
- List of narrative forms
- List of narrative techniques
