= Neo-Aristotelianism =

Neo-Aristotelianism may refer to:

- Neo-Aristotelianism (literature)
- Neo-Aristotelianism (philosophy)
