= Canadian Journal of Criminology and Criminal Justice =

- Discipline: Crime and Law Enforcement
- Language: English
- Edited by: Simon Verdun-Jones

Publication details
- Former name(s): Canadian Journal of Criminology, Canadian Journal of Criminology and Corrections, Canadian Journal of Corrections
- History: 1958-present
- Publisher: University of Toronto Press (Canada)
- Frequency: Quarterly

Standard abbreviations
- ISO 4: Can. J. Criminol. Crim. Justice

Indexing
- ISSN: 1707-7753 (print); 1911-0219 (web)

Links
- Journal homepage

The Canadian Journal of Criminology and Criminal Justice is a quarterly peer-reviewed academic journal covering the theoretical and scientific aspects of the study of crime and the practical problems of law enforcement, administration of justice and the treatment of offenders, particularly in the Canadian context. It is published by the University of Toronto Press.

== Abstracting and indexing ==
The journal is abstracted and indexed in:

- Academic Search Alumni Edition
- Academic Search Complete
- Academic Search Elite
- Academic Search Premier
- Academic Search Ultimate
- Advanced Placement Source
- Applied Social Sciences Index and Abstracts
- Book Review Digest Plus
- Business Source Corporate
- Business Source Corporate Plus
- Canadian Reference Centre
- China Education Publications Import & Export Corporation (CEPIEC)
- Criminal Justice Abstracts
- Criminal Justice Abstracts with Full Text
- Criminal Justice Periodical Index
- CrossRef
- Current Contents
- Current Contents—Social and Behavioral Sciences
- Current Law Index
- EJS EBSCO Electronic Journals Service
- Expanded Academic Index
- Google Scholar
- Index to Canadian Legal Literature
- Index to Periodical Articles Related to Law
- International Security & Counter-Terrorism Reference Center (ISCTRC)
- JCR: Social Science Edition
- Legal Collection
- Legal Source
- MasterFILE Complete
- MasterFILE Elite
- MasterFILE Premier
- Microsoft Academic Search
- OmniFile Full Text Mega
- Project MUSE
- Psychological Abstracts
- Psychology & Behavioral Sciences Collection
- Scopus
- Social Sciences Abstracts
- Social Sciences Citation Index
- Social Sciences Full Text
- Social Science Source
- Social Work Abstracts
- SocINDEX
- SocINDEX with Full Text
- SocINFO
- Sociology Source Ultimate
- Violence and Abuse Abstracts
- Web of Science
