= William Keast =

William Keast may refer to:

- William Keast (New South Wales politician) (1872–1938), member of the New South Wales Legislative Assembly
- William Keast (Victorian politician) (1866–1927), member of the Victorian Legislative Assembly
- William Rea Keast, American scholar and academic administrator
