= Todd McGowan =

American philosopher

- Born: October 9, 1967 (age 59); Dayton, Ohio, U.S.

Academic background
- Education: Ohio State University (PhD)
- Thesis: The Empty Subject: The New Canon and the Politics of Existence (1996)
- Doctoral advisor: Walter A. Davis
- Influences: Slavoj Žižek

Academic work
- Era: Contemporary philosophy
- Region: Western philosophy
- School or tradition: Continental, Hegelianism, Lacanianism, existentialism
- Institutions: University of Vermont
- Main interests: Psychoanalytic film theory
- Website: https://www.uvm.edu/cas/english/profiles/todd-mcgowan

Todd McGowan (born October 9, 1967) is an American film scholar, philosopher, and professor of English at the University of Vermont where he teaches film and cultural theory. He works on Hegel, psychoanalysis, and existentialism, and the intersection of these lines of thought with the cinema. McGowan is the author of more than 15 books, editor of Film Theory in Practice series from Bloomsbury and co-editor of the Diaeresis series at Northwestern University Press with Slavoj Žižek and Adrian Johnston. McGowan's work has been described as a "Politics of Death Drive". McGowan cohosts the podcast Why Theory with Ryan Engley.

== Work ==
=== Hegelianism ===
In Emancipation After Hegel (2019), Todd McGowan presents ‘a new radical Hegel’, dispensing with the infamous formula of the dialectic as ‘thesis, antithesis, synthesis’, McGowan maintains that contradiction is not the opposition of an antithesis to a thesis, but occurs when a position follows its own internal logic and exposes its inner division. According to McGowan, Freud's psychoanalytic theory ‘provides a theoretical supplement for Hegel’. By conceptualizing the unconscious, Freud sees subjectivity through a contradiction that it cannot eliminate.

== Bibliography ==
- McGowan, Todd (2026). Self-Sabotage: How We Try Not to Flourish. Polity Press. ISBN 978-1-5095733-7-0.
- McGowan, Todd (2025). The Cambridge Introduction to Jacques Lacan. Cambridge Introductions to Literature. Cambridge: Cambridge University Press. doi:10.1017/9781009300742. ISBN 978-1-009-30072-8.
- McGowan, Todd (2025). Pure Excess: Capitalism and the Commodity. Columbia University Press. doi:10.7312/mcgo21758. ISBN 978-0-231-56180-8. JSTOR 10.7312/mcgo21758.
- McGowan, Todd (2024). Embracing Alienation: Why we Shouldn't Try to Find Ourselves. London: Repeater Books. ISBN 978-1-915672-22-3.
- McGowan, Todd (2022). Enjoyment Right & Left. New York: Sublation Media. ISBN 979-8-9867884-0-1.
- McGowan, Todd (2022). The Racist Fantasy: The Unconscious Roots of Hatred. New York: Bloomsbury. ISBN 978-1-5013-9280-1.
- McGowan, Todd (2019). Universality and Identity Politics. Columbia University Press. doi:10.7312/mcgo19770. ISBN 978-0-231-55230-1. JSTOR 10.7312/mcgo19770.
- McGowan, Todd (2019). Emancipation After Hegel: Achieving a Contradictory Revolution. Columbia University Press. doi:10.7312/mcgo19270. ISBN 978-0-231-54992-9. JSTOR 10.7312/mcgo19270.
- McGowan, Todd (2017). Only a Joke Can Save Us: A Theory of Comedy. Evanston: Northwestern University Press. doi:10.2307/j.ctv47w7ff. ISBN 978-0-8101-3582-6.
- McGowan, Todd (2016). Capitalism and Desire: The Psychic Cost of Free Markets. doi:10.7312/mcgo17872. ISBN 978-0-231-54221-0.
- McGowan, Todd (2015). Psychoanalytic Film Theory and The Rules of the Game. New York: Bloomsbury. ISBN 978-1-62892-084-0. Translated into Persian
- McGowan, Todd (2014). Spike Lee. Champaign: University of Illinois Press. ISBN 978-0-252-09540-5. JSTOR 10.5406/j.ctt7zw5f7.
- McGowan, Todd (2013). Enjoying What We Don't Have: The Political Project of Psychoanalysis. Lincoln: University of Nebraska Press. doi:10.2307/j.ctt1ddr7nv. ISBN 978-0-8032-4511-2. JSTOR j.ctt1ddr7nv.
- McGowan, Todd (2012). The Fictional Christopher Nolan. doi:10.7560/737822. ISBN 978-0-292-73783-9.
- McGowan, Todd; Eisenstein, Paul (2012). Rupture: On the Emergence of the Political. Evanston: Northwestern University Press. doi:10.2307/j.ctv43vtq0. ISBN 978-0-8101-6630-1.
- McGowan, Todd (2012). The End of Dissatisfaction?: Jacques Lacan and the Emerging Society of Enjoyment. SUNY Press. doi:10.1515/9780791485712 (inactive 5 July 2025). ISBN 978-0-7914-8571-2. Translated into Japanese
- McGowan, Todd (2011). Out of Time: Desire in Atemporal Cinema. Minneapolis: University of Minnesota Press. doi:10.5749/minnesota/9780816669950.001.0001. ISBN 978-1-4529-4709-9. JSTOR 10.5749/j.cttttprf.
- McGowan, Todd (2007). The Impossible David Lynch. New York: Columbia University Press. ISBN 978-0-231-13954-0. Translated into Persian
- McGowan, Todd (2007). The Real Gaze: Film Theory after Lacan. New York: SUNY Press. ISBN 978-0-7914-7039-8. Translated into Turkish, Polish, and Persian.
- McGowan, Todd (2004). The End of Dissatisfaction? Jacques Lacan and the Emerging Society of Enjoyment. State University of New York Press. ISBN 978-0-7914-5968-3.
- McGowan, Todd (2000). The Feminine "No!". doi:10.1515/9780791491065. ISBN 978-0-7914-9106-5. JSTOR jj.18255528.

=== Edited ===
- McGowan, Todd; Kunkle, Sheila, eds. (2004). Lacan and Contemporary Film. New York: The Other Press. ISBN 978-1-59051-084-1.
- McGowan, Todd; Zeiher, Cindy, eds. (2017). Can Philosophy Love? Reflections and Encounters. London: Rowman & Littlefield. ISBN 978-1-78660-323-4.
- Finkelde, Dominik; Todd, McGowan, eds. (2023). Žižek Responds!. London: Bloomsbury. ISBN 978-1-350-32894-5.

== See also ==
- Psychoanalytic film theory
- Ljubljana school of psychoanalysis
