= Henry Aiken =

Henry Aiken may refer to:

- Henry Aiken Worcester (1802–1841), American minister
- Henry David Aiken (1912–1982), American philosopher
- Henry Aiken (figure skater)
