= Herbert Wichelns =

Herbert August Wichelns (December 29, 1894 – March 4, 1973) was an American rhetorician.

== Personal life ==
Wichelns grew up in New York, attending Boys’ High School in Brooklyn. He attended college at Cornell University. Wichelns was awarded an A.B. degree in 1916 and a Ph.D. in 1922. He was a second lieutenant in the US Army during the First World War.

== University career ==
He taught at Cornell as an assistant instructor and instructor from 1916 to 1917 and, after his military service, as an instructor at Dartmouth College from 1920 to 1921 and at New York University in 1922. After that he became an assistant professor at the University of Pittsburgh in 1923–24. He returned to Cornell as an assistant professor until 1931, when he became a full professor. Wichelns retired in 1962.

== Rhetoric ==
Herbert Wichelns addressed neo-Aristotelianism in his work "The Literary Criticism of Oratory", which "has justly been hailed as one of the most fruitful and influential studies produced in our day in the field of Speech." Wichelns focused on discovering criticism through rhetoric. He developed the study of the single speaker. Wichelns judged a rhetorician in terms of preparation, main ideas, credibility, personality, audience and other factors.

== Recognition ==
The James A. Winans-Herbert A. Wichelns Memorial Award for Distinguished Scholarship in Rhetoric and Public Address has been awarded annually since 1966 by the National Communication Association (NCA) for scholarship published during the year by NCA members.

== Publications ==
- A History of the Speech Association of the Eastern States 1909-1959 (1969)
- James Albert Winans, 1872-1956 (1957)
- Colleague and Scholar (1955)
- Burke's Essay on the Sublime and its Reviewers (1922)
- James Albert Winans (1961)
- Great Teachers of Speech: Wayland Maxfield Parrish: Colleague and Scholar (1955)
- The Literary Criticism of Oratory (1925)
- Analysis and Synthesis in Argumentation (1925)
- Public Speaking and the Dramatic Arts (1959)
- Ralph Waldo Emerson (1960)
