= Kafka's Prayer =

1947 book by Paul Goodman

- First edition
- Author: Paul Goodman
- Subject: Literary criticism
- Published: 1947 (Vanguard Press)
- Pages: 265
- OCLC: 3317997

Kafka's Prayer is a 1947 book-length analysis of the novelist Franz Kafka and his works by Paul Goodman. Using Freudian and Reichian psychoanalysis, Goodman assesses the philosophical and religious significance of Kafka's aphoristic statements and three novels. He levels an anarchist societal critique against social institutions borne from neuroticism. Goodman used the book, published by Vanguard Press, to grapple with the religious implications of psychoanalysis and transition from a career writing on Jewish concerns to a period that would culminate in his collaboration on the founding work of the gestalt therapy movement.

Many reviewers and commentators felt that Goodman overanalyzed Kafka and overextended specific symbolism, with farfetched or reductive speculation and obscure personal referents. Goodman's monograph was the first on Kafka in the English language and holds an idiosyncratic place in Kafka studies.

== Contents ==
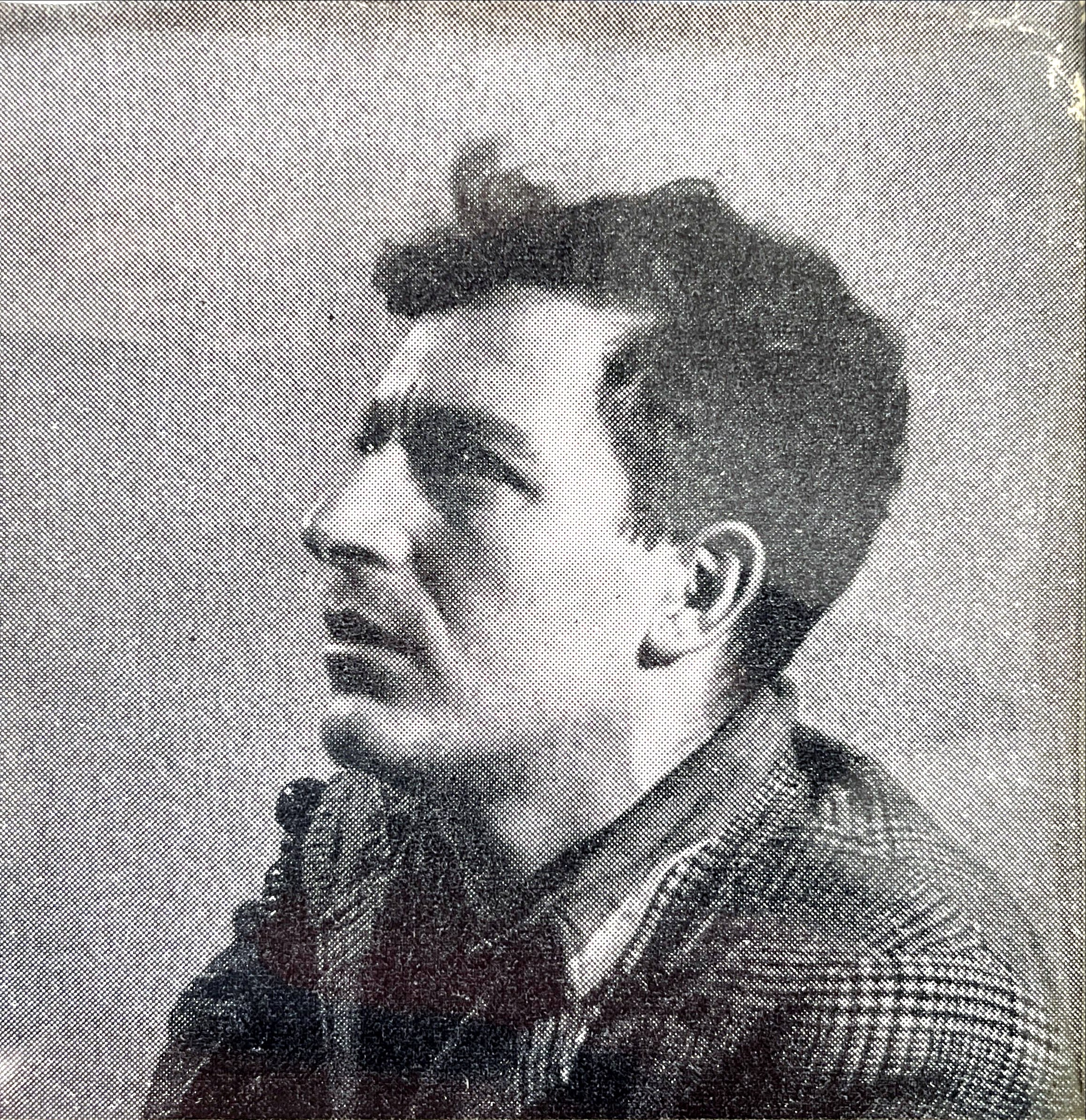
The author, as depicted in the book's original dust jacket

Kafka's Prayer is a book of literary criticism by Paul Goodman about the works of novelist Franz Kafka. The book's title comes from a statement by Kafka that "writing is a form of prayer". Goodman, the critic, holds that Kafka, as a "sick consciousness", used his literature as a prayer to lift from near-psychotic, self-punishing fear. Despite this anxious melancholy, Goodman argues that moments of Kafka show the release of "natural powers" and "natural morality", revealing man's "general freedom". Goodman encourages Kafka to be read as a procession of self-release, to find life in the escape from misery and repression.

The book's first section analyzes the religious and philosophical significance of Kafka's aphorisms and statements. Goodman's analysis of Kafka's shorter parables and aphorisms relies on religious existentialism and Taoism, while the rest of his criticism rests in Freudian interpretation by dint of Wilhelm Reich. His book descends into a psychopathology of Kafka as expressed through his fiction or theology. Goodman's Freudian analysis of Kafka's novels Amerika, The Trial, and The Castle connects Kafka's neurotic tensions and repressions, such as guilt, self-hatred, narcissism, homosexuality, familial fixations, with Kafka's fictional drama. For example, The Trial's paranoia stems from repressed homosexuality and delusions of reference. The Castle, representing "constructive will", has the protagonist futilely failing to surmount obstacles of his own device. Goodman contends that Kafka's most successful work combines "prayer" (expression of need and guilt) and "dream" (psychic conflict resolved through projection). Goodman also challenges Max Brod, Kafka's literary executor, on his interpretation of Kafka's novels.

A significant portion of the book is dedicated to an anarchist societal critique, grounded in the ideas of Peter Kropotkin. Goodman describes the sickness of societal institutions, such as the castle and the courts, as both created and sustained by neurotic impulse. Beneath Kafka's portrayal of "an ego closed to instinct", Goodman finds an admirable advocacy for community and the wisdom of instinct. Overall, Goodman takes a personal approach to his analysis, stating that while he approached the task in belligerence, "in hatred and envy" of Kafka, as "a kind of polemic and self-defense", he ultimately found himself endeared to his subject. Goodman believes Kafka to have been established as a "great writer" by both the passage of time and how reality has come to approximate Kafka's fiction.

== Publication ==
Vanguard Press published the book in New York in 1947 with a simultaneous Canadian edition by the Copp Clark Company. It was the first English-language monograph on Kafka. Hillstone/Stonehill Publishing published a facsimile reprint in June 1976 with an introduction by Raymond Rosenthal. Goodman reused a section of the book in his published dissertation, The Structure of Literature (1954).

In the arc of Goodman's development as a writer, the mid-to-late forties were when Goodman experimented with psychoanalysis and religion. He began a self-analysis in 1946, the year before he published Kafka's Prayer, and came to view psychoanalysis as his religion, preferring its explanations for "animal nature, ego, and the world". Kafka's Prayer was his synthesis of those experiments and one of his early, major works in his psychoanalytic period that would culminate in his collaboration on Gestalt Therapy (1951). At the time of publication, Goodman had been making a career on publishing on Jewish concerns, in this case, Kafka's Judaism. He used the book to grapple with the religious implications of psychoanalysis, a theme that recurred throughout his later work.

== Reception ==
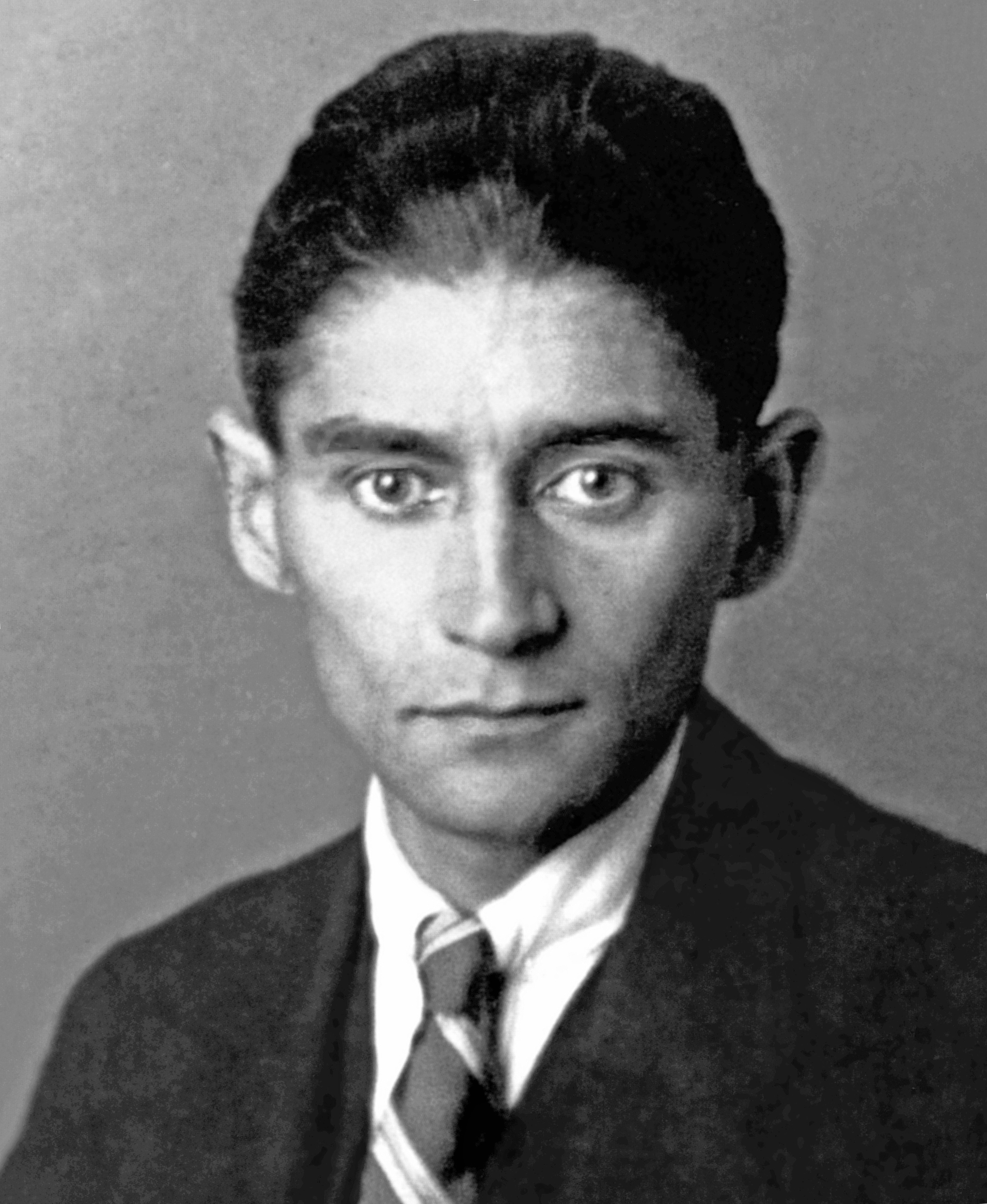
Novelist Franz Kafka, the subject of Goodman's analysis

Many reviewers and commentators felt that Goodman overanalyzed Kafka. Goodman's speculative Freudian interpretations were so "far-fetched" and dense as to offend the reader, wrote literary critic Philip Rahv and Goodman's literary executor Taylor Stoehr. Reviewers chafed when Goodman prioritized his self-expression over his subject matter, which they described as distracting or confusing as Goodman sparred with his subject matter, leaving the reader worse off for understanding than they started. Rahv wrote that this was not the role of the literary critic, and Goodman's own idiosyncrasies exacerbated his interpretation of Kafka's, already a complex figure whose writing did not follow a simple formula. In some cases both Goodman's personally charged reading and his compression of detail worked against him, as The New York Times found, obscuring his many cultural allusions across religion, philosophy, education, and psychology.

Some commentators noted that Goodman overextended specific symbolism. While the literary critic Kingsley Widmer did not contest the role of some familial elements in Kafka's fiction, such as his relationship with his father and marriage, the critic found Goodman's literalist and clinical interpretations of phallic and sexual imagery to be unhelpful, tiresome, and largely obtuse. For example, how Goodman extended the "paranoiac dream" of The Trial into one of "repressed homosexuality", and turned "The Burrow" into a story of the mother's body and the threat of the father's penis. These arguments, in Widmer's eyes, dampened Goodman's argument that the "natural theology" in Kafka was more allegorical of his self and psychosis than of bureaucracy. Minding these stretches of interpretation, the New York Herald Tribune reviewer wondered why Goodman omitted stories with clear psychoanalytic material such as "Description of a Struggle" and "Sorrows of a Family Man". Simon O. Lesser in Modern Fiction Studies faults Goodman with over-conflating the story with the author. Goodman, says Lesser, judges The Trial by an "extrinsic philosophical standard" despite the novel being a projection of the author's thought and not necessarily a profession of the author's beliefs. The reviewer, however, wrote that Goodman's other insights outweighed these errors, and appreciated Goodman's biographical linkage between Kafka's warders and executors and Kafka's two brothers who died in infancy. Rahv, on the other hand, in the Saturday Review of Literature, was perplexed at the lack of evidence for this linkage. Goodman's use of psychoanalysis, said Rahv, was less of a science than a "kind of free-for-all dialectic" in which any writer could assert anything they want. Rahv thought that Goodman's utopian conclusions missed the point of Kafka's world of contingency and dread. A young Martin Gardner, who otherwise praised Goodman's understanding of Freud, was also startled by Goodman's suggestion that the death of Kafka's younger two brothers caused his guilt neurosis.

The New York Times review challenged Goodman's assertion that little had been written about Kafka, citing a recent biography, anthology, and essays, but wrote that Goodman's analysis was among the most ambitious attempted on Kafka. Goodman's commentary, however, was on par with that which has been written before, particularly his intuition of Kafka's character, familial relationships, and occupation. Widmer too found the writing uneven compared to other period works on Kafka. But as a work of criticism, the New York Times review considered Goodman's reading of Kafka to be "profound and erudite" and Joshua Bloch, in Jewish Criterion, wrote that Goodman "brilliantly analyzed" the "subtleties of anxiety, supplication, pain, and pride" in Kafka's writing. In his assessment of Goodman's impact, Peter Parisi wrote that Kafka's Prayer had "a secure if idiosyncratic place in Kafka studies".

Amidst Goodman's overall oeuvre, selections from Kafka's Prayer are among the best representations of the foundational role that literary criticism played in Goodman's thought, according to Widmer. In the trajectory of Goodman's thought, Kafka's Prayer marked where Goodman first found a dead end in Freudian psychoanalysis and turned towards existentialism and Taoist interpretations. Kafka's Prayer also marked the confluence of Goodman's anarchism and psychoanalysis, where his millenarian social thought matched excerpts from Kafka's texts. He would write that the anarchist Kropotkin's core truth, that nature heals what is left alone, is also the core of Kafka's wayward spirit of youth. Goodman concluded:

In principle the dilemma of the shut-in will and ego is not natural and inevitable; it is not man's fate as certain new theologians of the absurd declare it. I, for my part, believe that it is a disease of our personalities and our institutions. (Yes, this I know.) Kafka himself believed so, I have tried to show. But I believe there is a therapy for this disease, and even a politics. (If indeed I believe it, and this belief is not my own castle.)

— Kafka's Prayer, p. 220
