= Real Great Society =

Former Puerto Rican youth collective in New York City

The Real Great Society (RGS) was a Puerto Rican youth collective created by activists Angelo Gonzalez and Carlos ‘Chino’ García on New York City's Lower East Side in 1964. Its name was a reference to then-President Lyndon B Johnson’s Great Society. Its goal was to help residents of the poverty-stricken neighborhoods of New York City attain bottom-up self-sufficiency. In June 1967, RGS members created the University of the Streets, which one member described as an organization that would have "young people from the neighborhood develop a curriculum which is relevant to them, their lives, their experience." The school, housed in a building on the corner of Seventh Street and Avenue A, lasted for over 30 years. Chino Garcia and several other members of the Real Great Society went on to form CHARAS/El Bohio, considered a successor organization to RGS in 1979.
