= Walter A. Davis =

American dramatist

- Born: November 9, 1942 (age 83); Chicago, Illinois, U.S.

Academic background
- Education: Marquette University; University of Chicago (PhD)
- Thesis: Theories of Form in Modern Criticism: An Examination of the Theories of Kenneth Burke and R. S. Crane (1969)

Academic work
- Era: Contemporary philosophy
- Region: Western philosophy
- School or tradition: Continental philosophy
- Institutions: Ohio State University

Walter A. "Mac" Davis (born November 9, 1942) is an American philosopher, critic, and playwright. He is Professor Emeritus of English at Ohio State University and the author of eight books. Davis has also taught at the University of California, Santa Barbara. His theoretical work engages critically with psychoanalysis, Marxism, existentialism, Hegelian dialectics and postmodernism. For a more general audience, he has written plays and two volumes of essays in cultural criticism.

== Education and academic career ==
Born and raised in Chicago, Illinois, Davis earned a B.A. from Marquette University in 1964, an M.A. from the same institution in 1966, and a Ph.D. from the University of Chicago in 1969. He taught in the English departments at the University of California at Santa Barbara from 1969 to 1977 and at Ohio State University from 1977 to 2002, when he retired to focus on writing.

== Literary theory and criticism ==
As a theorist and critic of literature, Davis has been associated with the 'Chicago School' of R. S. Crane and Wayne C. Booth, but Davis's work shows him to be an engaged critic of these critics. His first book, The Act of Interpretation: A Critique of Literary Reason, published by The University of Chicago Press in 1978, stages a series of interpretations of William Faulkner's The Bear as a simultaneous demonstration and critique of critical pluralism. In his later book, Get The Guests: Psychoanalysis, Modern American Drama, and the Audience, Davis takes a more psychoanalytic approach, analyzing in depth five American plays - The Iceman Cometh, A Streetcar Named Desire, Death of a Salesman, Long Day's Journey into Night, and Who's Afraid of Virginia Woolf? - in terms of their psychological impact upon the audience. Critic Frank Lentricchia found Davis' Get The Guests "unparalleled" and wrote of the author, "Davis is a man of the theatre, he reads plays as theatrical events, and he can get at plays in ways that most people of the theatre cannot because he is a superb theorist and scholar as well."

== Philosophical works ==
Davis's most wide-ranging philosophical work is Inwardness and Existence: Subjectivity in/and Hegel, Heidegger, Marx, and Freud. In this book, Davis adumbrates a theory of the human subject (less technically, "the self") that dialectically integrates four theories of subjectivity usually considered incompatible: G. W. F. Hegel's self-consciousness, Martin Heidegger's existentialism, Karl Marx's dialectical materialism and related Marxist theories of ideology, and Sigmund Freud's psychoanalysis. In his consideration of Hegel, Davis argues that the Structuralism of Claude Lévi-Strauss and the Deconstruction of Jacques Derrida, Paul de Man, et al. represent prematurely arrested moments in a dialectical movement issuing in Hegelian "unhappy consciousness." At other points in the text Davis writes at length upon such topics as sexuality, love, neurosis, psychosis, death, capitalism, freedom and authenticity, seeking always to challenge the consensus of intellectual and/or popular discourse on these topics. In the section on existentialism, for example, Davis attempts to revitalize this philosophy by taking it beyond pop-Sartrean notions of freedom. He emphasizes the extent to which human freedom is not a given but merely a possibility. The struggle to achieve freedom and authenticity proceeds through the hard intellectual work that Davis calls "anti-bildung", the rooting out of all the ideological obfuscations that have been implanted in us by our families and cultures. Inwardness and Existence has influenced the writings of scholars as diverse as leading Anglican theologian Rowan Williams, former Archbishop of Canterbury, and film theorist Todd McGowan, who has said of it, "No one who reads [Inwardness and Existence] will ever think about existence itself in the same way again. Davis’s landmark work will profoundly transform anyone who reads it."

Building on the idea of anti-bildung, Davis's 2001 book Deracination: Historicity, Hiroshima, and the Tragic Imperative takes the historical trauma of the first atomic bombing as the basis for a radically interdisciplinary investigation of trauma generally and of historical discourse in particular, culminating in a chapter that combines psychoanalysis, history and aesthetics to argue for "artistic cognition as a distinct and primary way of knowing." The "deracination" of the title refers to the necessity of "deracinating," or "rooting out," the ideological "guarantees" that structure our responses to events both personal and political.

== Cultural criticism ==
Davis has written two volumes of essays in cultural criticism. Death's Dream Kingdom: The American Psyche Since 9-11 (2006) contains Davis's clearest and most direct statement of his concept of "deracinating" the "guaranteees" as well as essays on the Iraq War, Abu Ghraib, Christian fundamentalism, capitalism, ethics and evil. The essay "A Postmodernist Response to 9-11: Slavoj Zizek, or the Jouissance of an Abstract Hegelian" contains Davis's critique of critical theorist Slavoj Zizek and an extended critical discussion of Lacanian psychoanalysis. Davis's 2007 book Art and Politics: Psychoanalysis, Ideology, Theatre takes the controversy surrounding the play My Name is Rachel Corrie as a jumping-off point for a discussion of the role of the arts (specifically the theatre) in post 9-11 America. The book includes Davis's "Manifesto for a Progressive Theatre" and an argument for monologue as the form that can best accomplish the necessary task of dramatically examining what Davis calls "the tragic structure of experience.".

== Plays ==
Davis is both a playwright and an actor in regional theatre. His plays include: The Holocaust Memorial: A Play About Hiroshima; An Evening with JonBenet Ramsey, an exploration of the effects of childhood trauma; Between Two Deaths: Life on the Row, a monologue spoken by a murderer on death row; and Trim: The Tyger Woods Story, a satire of celebrity, media and race in America. As an actor his roles have ranged from Oscar Madison in Neil Simon's The Odd Couple to the title role in King Lear.

== Fiction ==
Davis is currently at work on an epic-length novel, a vast bildungsroman titled The Last Catholic.

== Select bibliography ==
=== Non-fiction ===
- The Act of Interpretation: A Critique of Literary Reason. Chicago: University of Chicago Press, 1978.
- Inwardness and Existence: Subjectivity in/and Hegel, Heidegger, Marx, and Freud. Madison: University of Wisconsin Press, 1989.
- Get The Guests: Psychoanalysis Modern American Drama, and the Audience. Madison: The University of Wisconsin Press, 1994.
- Deracination: Historicity, Hiroshima, and the Tragic Imperative. Albany: SUNY Press, 2001.
- Death's Dream Kingdom: The American Psyche Since 9-11. London and Ann Arbor: Pluto Press, 2006.
- Art and Politics: Psychoanalysis, Ideology, Theatre. London and Ann Arbor: Pluto Press, 2007.

=== Plays ===
- The Holocaust Memorial: A Play About Hiroshima. Bloomington: First Books, 2000.
- An Evening With JonBenet Ramsey: A Play and Two Essays. iUniverse, 2003.
- Between Two Deaths: Life on the Row (monologue of a murderer on death row), included in Art and Politics, 2007.
- Trim: The Tyger Woods Story, 2010.
- Aberration of Starlight: A Play About Emily Dickinson, 2013.

=== Fiction ===
- The Last Catholic: A Novel, 2024
- Adultery in the Heart, 2026
