= Dominik Finkelde =

German Jesuit priest, philosopher and playwright

The Reverend Dominik Finkelde
- Born: 31 May 1970 (age 56); Berlin, West Germany

Academic background
- Education: University of Paris VIII (M.A.) Munich School of Philosophy (PhD)
- Influences: Kant; Hegel; Lacan; Žižek

Academic work
- Era: 20th-/21st-century philosophy
- Region: Western philosophy
- School or tradition: Continental philosophy; Ljubljana school of psychoanalysis; Lacanian psychoanalysis; Post-Hegelianism
- Main interests: Ideology; ontology; political theory; psychoanalysis; cultural studies; theology; German idealism; dialectic
- Website: hfph.de/hochschule/person/dominik-finkelde/

Dominik Finkelde (born 31 May 1970) is a German Jesuit priest, philosopher and playwright.

== Life and work ==
After graduating from high school, Finkelde studied philosophy, theology and literature in Berlin, Munich and Paris. In 2003, he earned his doctorate with a thesis on Walter Benjamin (Benjamin reads Proust) at the Munich School of Philosophy. Parallel to his studies, he joined the Jesuit Order in 1996 and began further education there. During the Magisterium, a two-year period of practical experience, he worked in the pastoral work in Mexico City and as lecturer of philosophy at the Universidad Iberoamericana. Dominik Finkelde was ordained as a Catholic priest by the Freiburg Bishop Bernd Uhl in June 2009 in the Cathedral of St. Blaise. He was assistant professor at the Munich School of Philosophy between 2010 and 2015 and habilitated at the Institute of Philosophy at the Goethe University Frankfurt am Main in 2014. Since 2015 he has been professor of contemporary philosophy and epistemology at the Munich School of Philosophy.

Since the mid-1990s, Finkelde has emerged as the author of dramatic and scientific texts. In 1996, he received the Gerhart Hauptmann Prize (together with Jens Roselt) for his first play, "Abendgruß", which premiered in 1998 at the Theater Magdeburg, depicting the fictitious biography of a former East German border guard. In the award of the jury, Klaus Völker wrote: "Here we have a small, very sensitive and cautiously depicted family drama ... in the tradition of Ibsen". His dystopia Berlin Underground is about the breakup of the two-class society in the near future and was premiered in 1999 by the Landesbühne Niedersachsen Nord in Wilhelmshaven. Other plays by Finkelde were staged in Bielefeld, Augsburg and Cottbus.

== Bibliography ==
=== Philosophy ===
- Benjamin liest Proust. Mimesislehre-Sprachtheorie-Poetologie. Fink, München 2003, ISBN 3-7705-3932-X.
- Politische Eschatologie nach Paulus. Badiou, Agamben, Žižek, Santner. Turia & Kant, Wien 2007, ISBN 978-3-85132-481-5.
- Slavoj Žižek zwischen Lacan und Hegel. Politische Philosophie, Metapsychologie, Ethik. Turia & Kant, Wien 2009, ISBN 978-3-85132-528-7.
- Exzessive Subjektivität. Eine Theorie tathafter Neubegründung des Ethischen nach Kant, Hegel und Lacan. Karl Alber, Freiburg 2015, ISBN 978-3-495-48770-9.
- Jacques Lacan. Struktur. Andersheit. Subjektkonstitution. August, Berlin 2015, ISBN 978-3-941360-37-2.
- Phantaschismus. Von der totalitären Versuchung unserer Demokratie. Vorwerk 8, Berlin 2016, ISBN 978-3-940384-83-6.
- Michel de Certeaus Metatheorie der Mystik. In: Janez Perčič, Johannes Herzgsell (Hrsg.): Grosse Denker des Jesuitenordens. Ferdinand Schöningh, Paderborn 2016, ISBN 978-3-506-78400-1, S. 121–134
- Das Objekt, das zu viel wusste. Eine Einführung in die Philosophie nach Lacan (Vorlesungen), Turia & Kant, Wien 2022, ISBN 978-3-98514-047-3.

==== Editorials ====
- Žižek Responds!, Eds, Dominik Finkelde and Todd McGowan, Bloomsbury Academic, 2023, ISBN 978-1-35032-893-8.
- Parallax: The Dialectics of Mind and World, Eds Dominik Finkelde, Slavoj Žižek and Christoph Menke, Bloomsbury Academic, 2021, ISBN 978-1-35017-205-0.
- In Need of a Master: Politics, Theology, and Radical Democracy, Eds. Dominik Finkelde and Rebekka Klein, De Gruyter, 2021, ISBN 978-3-11-069905-0.
- Badiou and the State, Ed. Dominik Finkelde, Nomos, 2017, ISBN 978-3-8452-7584-0.

==== Translated works ====
- Excessive Subjectivity -- Kant, Hegel, Lacan, and the Foundations of Ethics, Deva Kemmis and Astrid Weigert (trs.), Columbia University Press, 2017, ISBN 978-0-23117-318-6.

=== Drama ===
- Abendgruß. premiere 1 May 1998, Freie Kammerspiele, Magdeburg.
- Berlin Underground. premiere 18 September 1999, Landesbühne Niedersachsen Nord, Wilhelmshaven.
- Atlantis. premiere 12 May 2001, Theater Bielefeld.
- Porzellanschiff. premiere 26 October 2002, Landesbühne Niedersachsen Nord, Wilhelmshaven.
- Der Gutmensch. premiere 13 June 2003, Theater Augsburg.
- Die Nebensächlichen. premiere 3 October 2008, Staatstheater Cottbus.
