= James Phelan (literary scholar) =

American writer and literary scholar (born 1951)

- Born: January 25, 1951 (age 75); Flushing, New York
- Occupation: literary
- Writing career
- Notable work: Living to Tell About It: A Rhetoric And Ethics Of Character Narration
- Movements: Narratology, Rhetoric
- Website: english.osu.edu/people/phelan.1

James Phelan (pronounced /ˈfeɪlən/; born 1951) is an American writer and literary scholar of narratology. He is a third-generation Neo-Aristotelian literary critic of the Chicago School whose work builds on and refines the work of Wayne C. Booth with a focus on the rhetorical aspects of narrative. He is Distinguished University Professor of English at the Ohio State University.

Phelan is a member of the American Academy of Arts and Sciences (2025) and Norwegian Academy of Science and Letters (2016). He has been granted an honorary PhD degree from Aarhus University in Denmark (2013). In 2021, Phelan received the Wayne C. Booth Lifetime Achievement Award from the International Society for the Study of Narrative. The citation for the Award reads in part, "Phelan has influenced generations of narrative theorists and literary scholars, as he has provided a powerful model for thinking about the purposes of literature and reasons and methods to engage with it. In so doing, he has transformed and energized the interdisciplinary field of narrative studies." The recording of the Award ceremony from the May 2021 ISSN Conference can be found at the Society's website.

Phelan joined the faculty of Ohio State in 1977 after earning his MA and PhD from the University of Chicago. At the University of Chicago, he studied with the Chicago School theorists Sheldon Sacks and Wayne Booth.

Phelan was the editor of Narrative (the journal of the International Society for the Study of Narrative) from its inception in 1993 until 2025. He has written numerous books and articles on narrative theory that together offer a detailed elaboration of what he calls rhetorical poetics, that is, an exploration of what it means to conceive of narrative as rhetoric. He grounds this work in a default definition of narrative: "somebody telling somebody else on some occasion and for some purpose(s) that something happened." Phelan's books include Worlds from Words (1981), Reading People, Reading Plots (1989), Narrative as Rhetoric (1996), Living to Tell about It (2005), Experiencing Fiction: Judgments, Progressions, and the Rhetorical Theory of Narrative (2007), Reading the American Novel, 1920-2010 (2013), Somebody Telling Somebody Else: A Rhetorical Poetics of Narrative (2017), and Narrative Medicine: A Rhetorical Rx (2023). He collaborated with David Herman, Peter J. Rabinowitz, Brian Richardson, and Robyn Warhol on Narrative Theory: Core Concepts and Critical Debates (2012). In 2020, he collaborated with Matthew Clark on Debating Rhetorical Narratology: On the Synthetic, Mimetic, and Thematic Aspects of Narrative. In this book Clark responds to Phelan's previously published ideas about these aspects, especially in Reading People, Reading Plots, and then Phelan replies to Clark. In 2024, he collaborated with Simone Drake, Robyn Warhol, and Lisa Zunshine on Black Women's Stories of Everyday Racism: Narrative Analysis for Social Change

In 2018, the journal Style devoted a special double issue to his work: Phelan wrote a "target essay" (based on the theoretical argument in Somebody Telling Somebody Else), twenty-five others wrote short responses, and then Phelan replied to those responses. Phelan has also edited or co-edited several collections including the Blackwell Companion to Narrative Theory (2005, co-edited with Peter J. Rabinowitz), Teaching Narrative Theory (2010, co-edited with David Herman and Brian McHale), and Fictionality in Literature: Core Concepts Revisited (2022, co-edited with Lasse Gammelgaard, Stefan Iversen, Louise Brix Jakobsen, Richard Walsh, Henrik Zetterberg-Nielsen, and Simona Zetterberg-Nielsen). With Peter J. Rabinowitz, Phelan co-edited the Ohio State University Press book series The Theory and Interpretation of Narrative from 1993-2019. He now continues as co-editor with Katra Byram and Faye Halpern. Along with Frederick Aldama, Brian McHale, and David Herman, he founded Project Narrative, an initiative at Ohio State University.

Born in Flushing, NY, Phelan graduated in 1972 with a BA in English from Boston College. At BC he played on the basketball team, earning Academic All-American honors in 1972. In 1991, he wrote a memoir called Beyond the Tenure Track: Fifteen Months in the Life of an English Professor.

== Bibliography ==
- Black Women's Stories of Everyday Racism: Narrative Analysis for Social Change. New York: Routledge, 2024.
- Narrative medicine: A Rhetorical Rx. New York: Routledge, 2023.
- Fictionality in Literature: Core Concepts Revisited.Columbus: Ohio State University Press, 2022. Co-edited with Lasse Gammelgaard, Stefan Iversen, Louise Brix Jakobsen, Richard Walsh, Henrik Zetterberg-Nielsen, and Simona Zetterberg-Nielsen
- Debating Rhetorical Narratology: On the Synthetic, Mimetic, and Thematic Aspects of Narrative (with Matthew Clark). Columbus: Ohio State University Press, 2020.
- Somebody Telling Somebody Else: Toward a Rhetorical Poetics of Narrative. Columbus: Ohio State University Press, 2017.
- Reading the American Novel, 1920-2010. Malden: Wiley-Blackwell, 2013.
- Narrative Theory: Core Concepts and Critical Debates. Co-authored with David Herman, Peter J. Rabinowitz, Brian Richardson, and Robyn Warhol. Columbus: Ohio State University Press, 2012.
- After Testimony: The Ethics and Aesthetics of Holocaust Narrative for the Future. Co-edited with Susan Suleiman and Jakob Lothe. Columbus: Ohio State University Press, 2012.
- Fact, Fiction, and Form: Selected Essays of Ralph W. Rader. Columbus: Ohio State University Press, 2011.
- Teaching Narrative Theory. Co-edited with David Herman and Brian McHale. New York: MLA Publications, 2010.
- Joseph Conrad: Voice, Sequence, History, Genre. Co-edited with Jakob Lothe and Jeremy Hawthorn. Columbus: Ohio State University Press, 2008.
- Experiencing Fiction: Judgments, Progressions, and the Rhetorical Theory of Narrative. Columbus: Ohio State University Press, 2007.
- The Nature of Narrative. With Robert Scholes and Robert Kellogg. 2nd Edition. New York: Oxford University Press, 2006.*
- A Companion to Narrative Theory. Co-edited with Peter J. Rabinowitz. Malden: Blackwell, 2005.
- Living To Tell About It: A Rhetoric and Ethics of Character Narration. Ithaca: Cornell University Press, 2005.
- The Tempest: A Case Study in Critical Controversy. Co-edited with Gerald Graff. Boston: Bedford/St. Martin's, 2000.
- Narrative as Rhetoric: Technique, Audiences, Ethics, Ideology. Columbus: Ohio State University Press, 1996.
- Adventures of Huckleberry Finn: A Case Study in Critical Controversy. Co-edited with Gerald Graff. Boston: Bedford Books, 1995.
- Understanding Narrative. Co-edited with Peter J. Rabinowitz. Columbus: Ohio State University Press, 1994.
- Beyond the Tenure Track: Fifteen Months in the Life of an English Professor. Columbus: Ohio State University Press, 1991.
- Reading People, Reading Plots: Character, Progression, and the Interpretation of Narrative. Chicago: University of Chicago Press, 1989.
- Reading Narrative: Form, Ethics, Ideology. Editor. Columbus: Ohio State University Press, 1989.
- Worlds from Words: A Theory of Language in Fiction. Chicago: University of Chicago Press, 1981.
