= Charas/El Bohio =

New York community center in the 1980s and 90s

Coordinates: 40°43′35″N 73°58′46″W

CHARAS/El Bohio Community Center was a neighborhood organization and squatted community center in New York's East Village between 1979 and 2001.

== Background ==
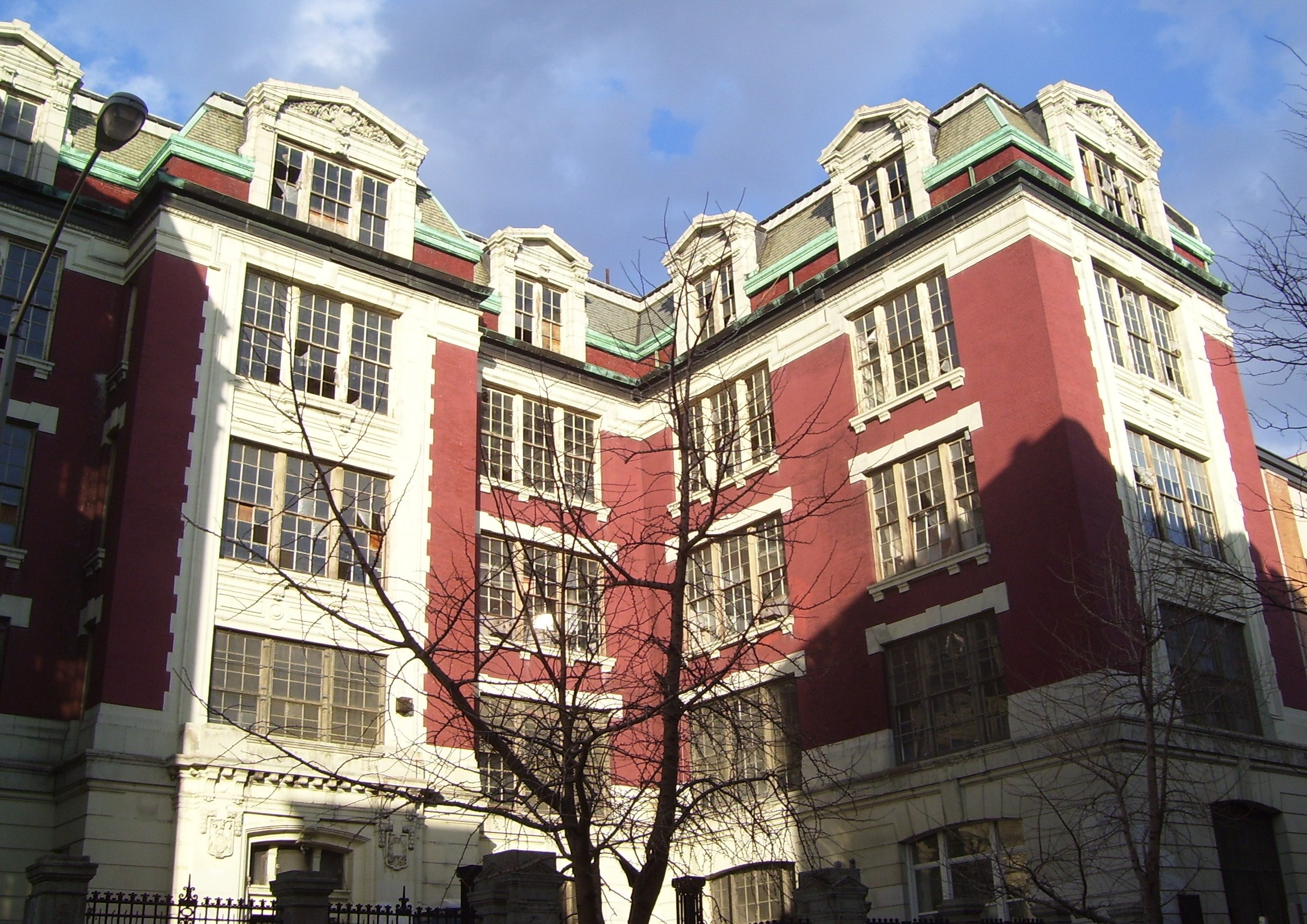
The former Public School 64 building in 2011

Public School 64, the 130,000-square-foot building in Manhattan's East Village that would become the CHARAS/El Bohio Community Center, was active between its completion in 1906 and its closure in 1977. It was designed in the French Renaissance Revival style by C.B.J. Snyder during a time when a population boom required schools. During New York's 1970s fiscal crisis, the surrounding neighborhood fell into disrepair. The building itself had become a drug house. Local residents, many Latino immigrants, reclaimed these buildings.

CHARAS was an organization that emerged from the Real Great Society, a self-organized, education-focused group of young organizers who had grown up in the neighborhood of Loisaida. Unlike the Real Great Society, CHARAS was a holistic, multi-issue organization that addressed issues as wide-ranging as housing, environmentalism, education, job training, and the arts. CHARAS was initially founded as the CHARAS committee in 1965, taking its name from the first initials of the founders: Chino Garcia, Humberto Crespo, Angelo González, Roy Battiste, (Moses) Anthony Figueroa, and Sal Becker. The committee formalized as an organization in the early 1970s. The organization consulted with mathematician Buckminster Fuller over many years on alternative technology, sweat equity, and geodesic domes to house the poor.

CHARAS originally squatted the nearby Christodora House with former Black Panthers in 1979 but came to an agreement with the city to vacate the settlement house in exchange for the derelict, former P.S. 64. In a gentlemen's agreement, a private developer purchased the Christadora (to become luxury condominiums) and CHARAS began to build P.S. 64 into El Bohio.

== Activity ==
CHARAS moved into P.S. 64 in 1979. The squatters renovated into a cultural center known as El Bohio ("the hut"). The community center's arts and cultural programming included classes, meeting spaces, studio spaces, after-school activities, tutoring, a bicycle recycling program, with showing including dance, film, and theater. Director Spike Lee showed his work at El Bohio while studying at New York University. In its time, CHARAS/El Bohio was among the most prominent of a series of institutions secured through community effort and served as the political center of multiple community centers and gardens founded in the same period.

The building was frequently filled with art, including huge sculptures and floats. Its auditorium, rooms, or full building were available for rental at affordable prices. Community gardening groups often met there, and the banners and puppets behind the community's famous spring and winter festivals were built there. Anthropologist David Graeber described it as an "inestimable resource" for activists.

== Eviction ==
Within three years of the squat, a local community board had recommended that CHARAS receive the building's lease. This request was upheld by the City Council, Department of City Planning, and the City Planning Commission. They received the lease and made offers to buy the building that the city deemed unworkable. The city decided to sell the building in 1996. Community activists fought to keep the building in community possession. The activists, upon seeing that CHARAS and other community gardens were listed for auction in July 1998, coordinated the release of 10,000 crickets to disrupt it, an event that is mythical among Lower East Side activists. After a brief intermission, the building sold for $3.15 million to Gregg Singer, who was originally anonymous but later revealed as a campaign contributor of Mayor Rudolph Giuliani. Singer immediately served an eviction order, which wasn't enforced until December 2001. During that period, the Village Voice rated the site as the city's "Best Place to Rally Around and/or Resuscitate" based on its community services for the Lower East Side. The eviction was delayed by the September 11 attacks and by "Singer alerts", in which the landlord was required to announce prospective tenant visits in advance, giving activists ample time to organize an impromptu demonstration. An initial trial ruled unanimously in favor of CHARAS but was invalidated by a second judge. Squatters planned to occupy and defend the building, particularly to protect precedent, but CHARAS demurred because they wanted the city's future support as a community organization. New York Reclaim the Streets held a block party for a final defense and celebration of the space, which had become a symbolic for community losses due to gentrification.

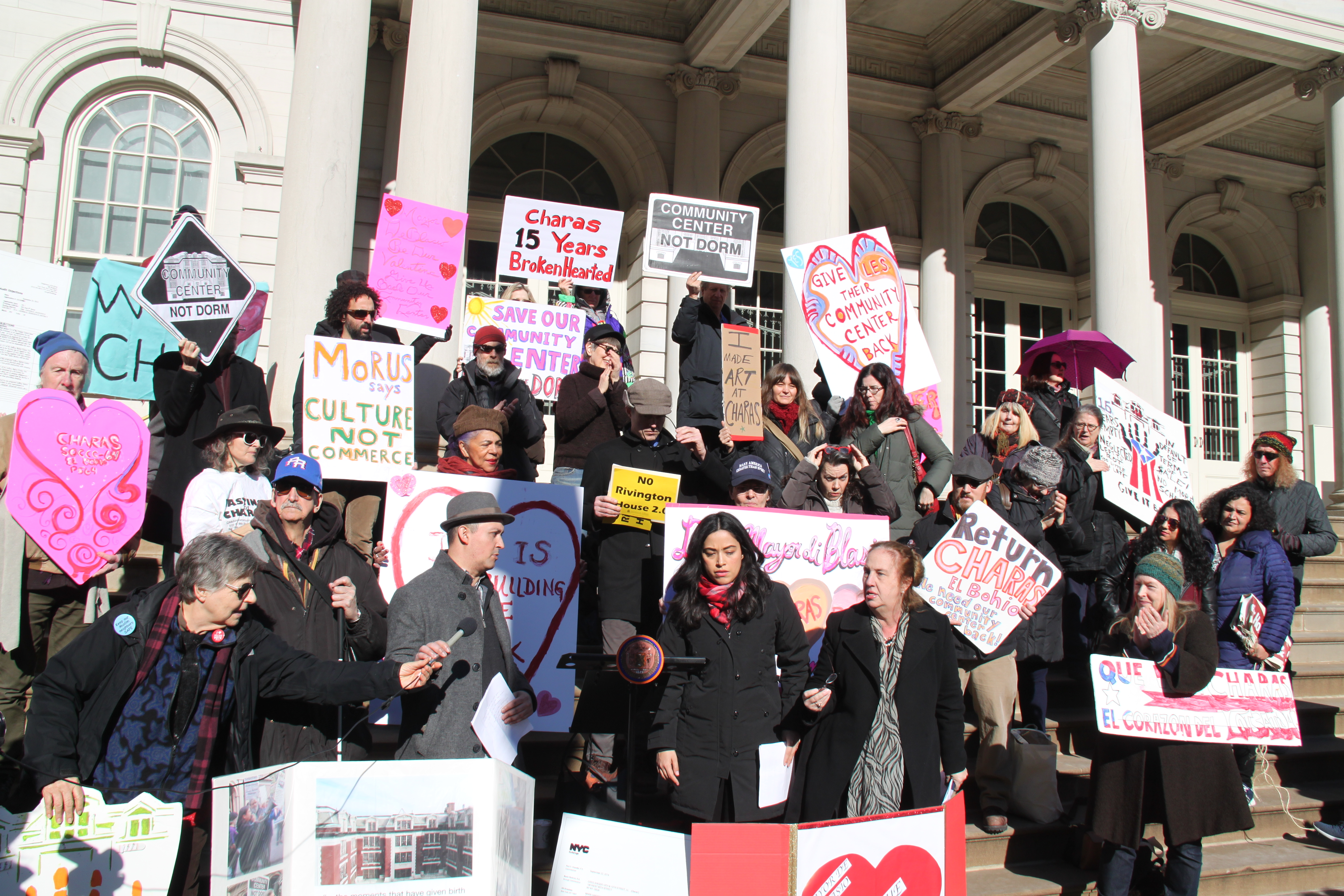
Rally held at the site in 2017

As of 2022, the building was left undeveloped and the property foreclosed, while multiple protests have been held in support of returning the building to community oriented use. At the time of eviction, Singer planned to turn the building into a college dormitory but the Department of Buildings has denied the project. The building was designated as a landmark in 2006, limiting Singer's high-rise plans. Additionally, a local law requires proof of a 10-year lease from a college before approving dorm development. Singer has filed multiple lawsuits against the city. In 2017, Mayor Bill de Blasio expressed interest in the city repurchasing the building. As of 2008, the CHARAS organization remained without a home.

Singer's lender, Madison Realty Capital, began foreclosure proceedings in 2018 for missed mortgage payments, claiming to be owed over $100 million. To avoid foreclosure, Singer put the building into bankruptcy in March 2023. The bankruptcy auction was canceled when the only bid came from its lender for $55 million. The lender sold the loan to 605 East 9th Community Holdings, which The Real Deal reports is connected to Aaron Sosnick, a billionaire who previously expressed interest in the property.

== Bibliography ==
- Graeber, David (2008). Direct Action: An Ethnography. Oakland, CA: AK Press. ISBN 978-1-904859-79-6.
- Hobbs, Allegra (June 1, 2018). "Gentrification's Empty Victory". The New York Times. ISSN 0362-4331.
- Shepard, Benjamin (2009). "Community Gardens, Convivial Spaces, and the Seeds of a Radical Democratic Counterpublic". In Gautney, Heather; Dahbour, Omar; Dawson, Ashley; Smith, Neil (eds.). Democracy, States, and the Struggle for Social Justice. Routledge. pp. 273–296. ISBN 978-0-415-98982-4.
- Shepard, Benjamin (2012). Play, Creativity, and Social Movements: If I Can't Dance, It's Not My Revolution. Routledge. ISBN 978-1-136-82964-2.
- Starecheski, Amy (2016). Ours to Lose: When Squatters Became Homeowners in New York City. University of Chicago Press. ISBN 978-0-226-39994-2.
