= Wayland Maxfield Parrish =

American professor and writer

Wayland Maxfield Parrish (March 7, 1887 – December 31, 1970) was an American professor and writer.

== Life and career ==
Born in Mohawk, Ohio, in 1887, he is noted for writing a few books dealing with rhetoric titled Reading Aloud, Speaking in Public, American Speeches, The Teacher's Speech, and Richard Whately's Elements of Rhetoric: Parts I and II. His most well-known are Reading Aloud and American Speeches. He also wrote and contributed to various journal articles concerning speech and rhetoric. He graduated from Cornell's linguistics program, he went on to teach at the University of Pittsburgh and then the University of Illinois.

Parrish was the first of many English professors to come from Cornell and Cornell's famous 1920s rhetoric program. In 1926 he gave a series of radio talks broadcast from the University of Pittsburgh's KDKA station concerning public speaking and the many misconceptions surrounding it titled A Series of Six Radio Talks on Public Speaking. In 1930, Parrish was promoted to the rank of a full professor at the University of Pittsburgh and appointed head of the English department's Division of Public Speaking. Parrish was an important and influential figure on campus, and the William Pitt Debating Union continues to sponsor a Wayland Maxfield Parrish award. In 1936, Parrish left the University of Pittsburgh to take a position at the University of Illinois where he taught until his retirement in 1955. Like his time at the University of Pittsburgh, while at the University of Illinois he wrote several journal articles and his most famous works The Teacher’s Speech in 1939, Reading Aloud: A Technique in the Interpretation of Literature in 1941, and Speaking in Public in 1947. In 1954, Parrish wrote American Speeches with one of his former students from the University of Pittsburgh. He has an award under his name at the University of Illinois.

Parrish died in Alachua, Florida, on December 31, 1970, at the age of 83.

== List of works ==
- A Series of Six Radio Talks on Public Speaking
- The Teacher's Speech
- Reading Aloud: A Technique in the Interpretation of Literature
- Speaking in Public
- American Speeches
- Richard Whately's Elements of Rhetoric: Parts I and II.
