= Chicago school (literary criticism) =

Form of criticism of English literature

The Chicago school of literary criticism was a form of criticism of English literature begun at the University of Chicago in the 1930s, which lasted until the 1950s. It was also called neo-Aristotelianism, due to its strong emphasis on Aristotle's concepts of plot, character and genre. It was partly a reaction to New Criticism, a then highly popular form of literary criticism, which the Chicago critics accused of being too subjective and placing too much importance on irony and figurative language. They aimed instead for total objectivity and a strong classical basis of evidence for criticism. The New Critics regarded the language and poetic diction as most important, but the Chicago school considered such things merely the building material of poetry. Like Aristotle, they valued the structure or form of a literary work as a whole, rather than the complexities of the language. Despite this, the Chicago school is considered by some to be a part of the New Criticism movement.

== Beginnings ==
Ronald Salmon Crane (1886–1967) is considered the founder of the Chicago Aristotelians. He began teaching at the University of Chicago in 1924, was made a professor in 1925, and chaired the English department there from 1935–1947. In 1935, he wrote “History versus Criticism in the Study of Literature” (published in English Journal 24 [1935]:645-67), in which he defined literary criticism as “simply the disciplined consideration, at once analytical and evaluative, of literary works as works of art.” Crane was greatly influenced by Richard McKeon, a professor of philosophy at the University, who stressed Aristotle's idea of "pluralism," which says that many systems of criticism are necessary to completely understand literature, specifically poetry, or in the case of philosophy, the world. Crane said that “the only rational ground for adhering to one [form of criticism] rather than to any of the others is its superior capacity to give us the special kind of understanding and evaluation of literature we want to get, at least for the time being.”

== Theory ==
The question for the Chicago school (as it was for Aristotle) was always what the purpose of the theory of criticism was, what hypotheses were brought to bear by the theory about the nature of literature (for instance, whether it consisted of the words alone, or whether it was to be thought of as part of a larger context such as an era or an artist's life), and the definitions of words (such as the definition of tragedy or comedy).

The Chicago school claimed not to preclude other theories of criticism. It did, however, criticize those who were not clear or consistent about the initial hypotheses and definitions behind their theories. It thus appeared to many of the proponents of those theories that the Chicago school was claiming that theirs was the only good and effective approach to literature. For this reason, they were considered by some critics (including W.K. Wimsatt, whose essay "The Chicago Critics" is a critical assessment of their work) to be hypocritical, although they would vehemently deny this.

== Purpose ==
Many of the ideas of the Chicago school are thought to have come out of the reorganization of undergraduate education at the University of Chicago by Robert Maynard Hutchins, then President there. He placed great importance on primary sources and interdisciplinary studies for all students. Crane and his colleagues were forced to defend English as a valid topic of study, and the Chicago school might have developed partly from this pressure to put the study of English on a sound classical basis.

Other key figures in the Chicago school were Norman Maclean, Elder Olson, William Rea Keast and Bernard Weinberg. After this first generation, the most important critics to carry on the theory were Wayne C. Booth (who taught at the University of Chicago from 1947-1950 and again from 1962 until his death in 2005) and his contemporaries, Richard L. Levin, Sheldon Sacks, Robert Marsh, Arthur Heiserman, Ralph W. Rader, and Mortimer J. Adler. Booth loosened the rigid categories of genre originally set forth by the Chicago school and moved the concentration away from poetry toward rhetoric. The Chicago school has demonstrated continuing importance, and continuing flexibility, in the work of the third-generation Chicago critics, including Michael Boardman, Barbara Foley, Walter A. Davis, Dorothy Hale, Elizabeth Langland, James Phelan, Peter J. Rabinowitz, David H. Richter, and Harry Shaw, among others.

== Works ==
Notable works in the Chicago school include Critics and Criticism (Crane, Chicago, 1952), The Languages of Criticism and the Structure of Poetry (Crane, Toronto, 1953), and The Rhetoric of Fiction (Booth, Chicago, 1983).

== Sources ==
- Castle, Gregory. The Blackwell Guide to Literary Theory. Oxford: Blackwell Publishing, 2007
- Selden, Raman. A Reader's Guide to Contemporary Literary Theory. Lexington: University Press of Kentucky, 1993
- Wolfreys, Julian, ed. Modern North American Criticism and Theory. Edinburgh: Edinburgh University Press Ltd., 2006
- Guerin, Wilfred L.; Labor, Earle; Lee, Morgan; Reesman, Jeanne C.; Willingham, John R. A Handbook of Critical Approaches to Literature, 3rd ed. Oxford: Oxford University Press, 1992
- Wellek, René. American Criticism, 1900-1950. New Haven: Yale University Press, 1986. Vol. 6 of A History of Modern Criticism: 1750-1950
