= William Rea Keast =

American academic administrator

William Rea Keast (November 1, 1914 – June 27, 1998) was an American scholar and academic administrator who served as president of Wayne State University from 1965 to 1971.

== Biography ==
=== Education ===
Keast was born on November 1, 1914, in Malta, Illinois. He attended the University of Chicago and received his Bachelor's in 1936. He continued his doctoral studies at Chicago but World War II forced him to serve in the United States Armed Forces from 1941 to 1946. He rose to the rank of major. Returning to the University of Chicago on a Rockefeller Postwar Fellowship, he earned his doctorate in 1947.

=== Career ===
Upon his graduation, he joined the University of Chicago faculty as assistant professor. In 1951 he moved to Cornell University as an associate professor and was promoted to professor in 1957. At Cornell, he became the chair of the Department of English in 1957, was named dean of the College of Arts and Sciences in 1962, and vice president for academic affairs in 1964. While at Cornell, he spent two years in England where he worked on his edition of Samuel Johnson's Lives of the Poets. Keast was an authority on 18th Century English Literature, and an important contributor to the Chicago School of literary criticism.

In 1965, he was selected as president of Wayne State University. He presided over Wayne State during a period of campus unrest in the late 1960s, during which he came under pressure from the Wayne State Board of Governors to clamp down on anti-war and other campus demonstrations, and to regulate the student newspaper, the name of which and editorial policies had been radically changed by students. He was considered a moderating figure who was able to relate well to students. During his tenure, Wayne State expanded significantly. Student enrollment increased from fewer that 30,000 to more than 35,000; general fund expenditures increased from $34 million to nearly $70 million; major buildings were constructed, including the Law School, Matthaei Physical Education complex, Physics Building and the Palmer Avenue Parking Structure; and new programs were established, including the Center for Urban Studies and the Commission on the Status of Women. He retired from Wayne State in 1971, citing as the reason for his resignation, "presidential fatigue".

After resigning from Wayne State, Keast then served as chair of the Commission on Academic Tenure in Higher Education in Washington, D.C., and later joined the faculty of the University of Texas at Austin, where he served as chairman of the English Department and Director of Special Library Collections, and remained until his retirement in 1980.

=== Honors ===
- Ford Fellow (1955–56)
- Guggenheim Fellow (1958–59)
- LLD (Honorary), the University of Michigan (1967)
- University of Chicago Alumni Distinguished Service Award (1970)
- President - Michigan Academy of Science, Arts, and Letters (1969–70)

== Selected Bibliography ==
"Some Seventeenth-Century Allusions to Shakespeare and Jonson," NQ, 29 October 1949, 468-69.

"Imagery and Meaning in the Interpretation of King Lear," Modern Philology, XLVII (1949), 45-64. Reprinted as "The ‘New Criticism’ and King Lear" in Critics and Criticism, ed. R. S. Crane (Chicago, 1952), 108-37.

"Johnson’s Criticism of the Metaphysical Poets," English Literary History, XVII (1950), 59-70. Reprinted in Eighteenth-Century English Literature: Modern Essays in Criticism, ed. J. L. Clifford (Oxford, 1959), 300-310.

"Killigrew’s Use of Donne in The Parson’s Wedding," Modern Language Review, XLV (1950), 512-15.

"Dryden Studies, 1895-1948," Modern Philology, XLVIII (1951), 205-10.

"The Theoretical Foundations of Johnson’s Criticism," Critics and Criticism, Ancient and Modern, ed. R. S. Crane (Chicago, 1952), 389-407.

"The Preface to A Dictionary of the English Language: Johnson’s Revisions and the Establishment of the Text," Studies in Bibliography, V (1952–53), 129-46.

"Some Emendations in Johnson’s Preface to the Dictionary," Review of English Studies, N.S. IV (1953), 52-57.

"Wallace Stevens’ ‘Thirteen Ways of Looking at a Blackbird,’" Chicago Review, Winter-Spring 1954, 48-63.

The Shakespeare Folios in the Cornell University Library (Ithaca, N.Y., 1954).

"Johnson’s Plan of a Dictionary: A Textual Crux," Philological Quarterly, XXXIII (1954), 341-47.

"The Language We Speak" with L. F. Powell, J. H. Sledd, and J. R. Sutherland, University of Chicago Round Table, May 1955.

"Self-quotation in Johnson’s Dictionary," Notes and Queries, September 1955, 392-93, June 1956, 262.

The Province of Prose, with R. E. Streeter (New York, 1956, second edition, 1962).

"The Element of Art in Gibbon’s History," English Literary History, XXIII (1956), 153-62.

"The Two Clarissas in Johnson’s Dictionary," Studies in Philology, LIV (1957), 429-39.

"Johnson and Intellectual History," New Light on Dr. Johnson, ed. Frederick W. Hilles (New Haven, 1959), 247-56.

"Editing Johnson’s Lives," New Rambler, June 1959, 15-29.

"Johnson and ‘Cibber’s’ Lives of the Poets, 1753," Restoration and Eighteenth-Century Literature, ed. Carroll Camden (Houston, 1962/63).

Seventeenth-Century English Poetry (Oxford, 1962, second edition, 1971).

"The True University of These Days is a Collection of Books," The Cornell Library Conference (Ithaca, N.Y., 1964), 41-50.

"Johnson as a Subscriber" with J. D. Fleeman and Donald Eddy, Johnsonian News Letter, XXV (December 1965), 2-3.

"Samuel Johnson and Thomas Maurice," Eighteenth-Century Studies in Honor of Donald F. Hyde, ed. W. H. Bond (New York, 1970), 63-79.

| Preceded by Clarence B. Hilberry | President of Wayne State University; 1965-1971 | Succeeded by George E. Gullen Jr. |
