= Narrative (journal) =

- Discipline: English literature
- Language: English
- Edited by: Kent Puckett, Marta Figlerowicz

Publication details
- History: 1993–present
- Publisher: Ohio State University (United States)
- Frequency: Triannually

Standard abbreviations
- ISO 4: Narrative

Indexing
- ISSN: 1063-3685 (print); 1538-974X (web)
- LCCN: 94659023
- JSTOR: 10633685
- OCLC no.: 25993282

Links
- Journal homepage

Narrative is an academic journal published by the Ohio State University that focuses on narratology. It is the official journal of the International Society for the Study of Narrative (formerly known as the Society for the Study of Narrative Literature from its founding in June 1984 until March 2008). Narrative is published triannually in January, May, and October.

The Journal of Narrative Technique was the Society for the Study of Narrative Literature's official journal until the founding of Narrative in January 1993. With the founding of the new journal, George and Barbara Perkins ended their tenures as editors of the Journal of Narrative Technique and took up posts as associate editors for Narrative. James Phelan served as Narrative's editor from its founding until the Fall 2024 issue, when he was succeeded by new editors Marta Figlerowicz and Kent Puckett.

Narrative was founded with the intention "to be an outlet for the best current thinking about narrative and narratives; an arena in which a plurality of critical voices will be welcome to speak; a site where theoretical exploration and interpretive practice inform—and sometimes challenge—one another"; and "a place where critics talk directly to each other."

In December 1993, the Council of Editors of Learned Journals named Narrative the best new journal of 1993.

In 2022, Journal Citation Reports ranked Narrative third out of the 208 literature journals it tracks in its Journal Citation Indicator metric, which measures the citation impact of published research.
