= Neo-Aristotelianism (literature) =

View of literature and rhetorical criticism

Neo-Aristotelianism is a view of literature and rhetorical criticism propagated by the Chicago school – Ronald S. Crane, Elder Olson, Richard McKeon, Wayne Booth, and others – which means:

"A view of literature and criticism which takes a pluralistic attitude toward the history of literature and seeks to view literary works and critical theories intrinsically."

In the field of speech communication, now communication studies, neo-Aristotelianism was among the first rhetorical methods of criticism. The first mention of using Aristotle's concepts for criticism was in Hoyt Hopewell Hudson's 1921 essay, “Can We Modernize the Study of Invention?” where Hudson implied the use of topoi for “speech or argument.” Its central features were more fully explicated in Herbert A. Wichelns's "The Literary Criticism of Oratory" in 1925. It focused on analyzing the methodology behind a speaker's ability to convey an idea to its audience. In 1943, neo-Aristotelianism was further publicized, gaining popularity after William Norwood Brigance published A History and Criticism of American Public Address.

Unlike rhetorical criticism, which concentrates on the study of speeches and the immediate effect of rhetoric on an audience, neo-Aristotelianism "led to the study of a single speaker because the sheer number of topics to cover relating to the rhetor and the speech made dealing with more than a single speaker virtually impossible. Thus, various speeches by different rhetors related by form of topic were not included in the scope of rhetorical criticism."

== "The Literary Criticism of Oratory" ==
Herbert Wichelns' work was one of the first that introduced neo-Aristotelianism. It narrowed down speech to 12 key topics to be studied, similar to many of the topics discussed by Aristotle in the Rhetoric. His topics for speech critique include:

- Speaker's personality
- Character of the speaker (how the audience views a speaker)
- Audience
- Major ideas
- Motives to which the speaker appealed
- Nature of the speaker's proof (credibility)
- Speaker's judgment of human nature in the audience
- Arrangement
- Mode of expression
- Speech preparation
- Delivery
- Effect of the discourse on the immediate audience and long-term effects

According to Mark S. Klyn, author of "Toward a Pluralistic Rhetorical Criticism," "The Literary Criticism of Oratory" provided "substance and structure to a study which heretofore had been formless and ephemeral [...] it literally created the modern discipline of rhetorical criticism." Thus regardless of the lack of detail on these topics, it provided a modern structure of critiquing and analyzing speech via neo-Aristotelianism, according to Donald C. Bryant.

== See also ==
- New rhetoric
- Poetics
