= Ronald Crane =

Ronald Salmon Crane (January 5, 1886 – July 12, 1967) was a literary critic, historian, bibliographer, and professor. He is credited with the founding of the Chicago School of Literary Criticism.

== Early life ==
Ronald Crane was born in Tecumseh, Michigan. He received his B.A. from the University of Michigan in 1908 and his Ph.D. in philosophy from the University of Pennsylvania in 1911. That same year, he became an instructor of English at Northwestern University. He was soon promoted to assistant professor, and then to associate professor in 1920. He continued to teach there until 1924, when he moved to the University of Chicago.

== The Chicago School of Critics ==
The Chicago School of Critics began its development during the mid-1930s, around the time that Crane was named head of the University of Chicago's English Department. During this time (from 1930 to 1952) Ronald Crane took on the role of managing editor for the University's publication Modern Philology publication. His essay titled “History Versus Criticism in the Study of Literature,” published in 1935, is considered the first publication of the Chicago School. Other members of the early School included W. R. Keast, Richard McKeon, Norman Maclean, Elder Olson, and Bernard Weinberg. The “group of friends” (as Crane called them) worked together to publish an anthology of their writings in 1952 titled Critics and Criticism: Ancient and Modern. That same year, Crane was named a Distinguished Service Professor Emeritus of English at the University of Chicago.

The School has often been called “Neo-Aristotelian,” though in the introduction to Critics and Criticism (and in other works, such as “Toward a More Adequate Criticism of Poetic Structure”) Crane argued strongly against that title. Regardless, Aristotle's Poetics and the method of inquiry he created played an important and obvious role in their works: Crane emphasized Form and Matter in his writings as inseparable entities within poetry, and frequently referred to Aristotle's distinction between imitative and non-imitative poetry. The prefix “Neo” is applied because of the modifications Crane makes to Aristotle's original theories in Poetics. The Chicago Critics also emphasized a necessity of multiple theories of criticism. Ronald Crane continually warned against “any effort to define authoritatively the frontiers and problems of our subject.” (Toward a More...). Instead of pursuing a final objective truth through criticism, the Chicago Critics saw criticism as a method, not an end. This created a tension between them and the New Critics, whose approach was often to outline fallacies and incorrect criticisms in an “authoritative” way that made Crane bristle.

== Death ==
Crane held positions in the American Academy of Arts and Sciences and was a member of the London Bibliographical Society. He was elected a corresponding fellow of the British Academy one month before he died following a long illness. His obituary included a retelling of the story that upon his death bed, Wayne C. Booth, one of his former students and another leader in the Chicago School, came to visit and suggested that Crane was looking better, upon which Crane retorted, “What is your evidence?” He died on July 12, 1967, in his home in Chicago, Illinois.

== Works By Crane ==
- New Essays by Oliver Goldsmith editor (1927)
- A Census of British Newspapers and Periodicals, 1620–1800 (1927) co-author
- A Collection of English Poems, 1660–1800 (1932) editor
- Critical and Historical Principles of Literary History author
- Languages of Criticism and the Structure of Poetry (1953)
- Critics and Criticism: Ancient and Modern (1952) editor and contributor
- Critics and Criticism: Essays in Method (1957) editor and contributor
- The Idea of the Humanities (1967)
