= Richard McKeon =

American philosopher

- Born: April 26, 1900; Union Hill, New Jersey, U.S.
- Died: March 31, 1985 (aged 84); Chicago, Illinois, U.S.

Education
- Education: Columbia University (BA, PhD); University of Paris (attended)
- Doctoral advisor: Frederick J. E. Woodbridge
- Other advisors: John Dewey; Étienne Gilson

Philosophical work
- Era: 20th-century philosophy
- Region: Western philosophy
- School: Chicago school of literary criticism Literary neo-Aristotelianism; New rhetoric Political pluralism
- Institutions: Columbia University; University of Chicago
- Doctoral students: Michael J. Buckley; Robert Denoon Cumming
- Notable students: William Alston; Eugene Gendlin; Robert M. Pirsig; Richard Rorty
- Main interests: Rhetoric, science and metaphysics, history of philosophy, literary criticism

Richard McKeon (/məˈkiːən/; April 26, 1900 – March 31, 1985) was an American philosopher and longtime professor at the University of Chicago. His ideas formed the basis for the UN's Universal Declaration of Human Rights.

== Education and career ==
McKeon obtained his undergraduate degree from Columbia University in 1920, graduating at the early age of 20 despite serving briefly in the U.S. Navy during the First World War. Continuing at Columbia, he completed a master's thesis on Leo Tolstoy, Benedetto Croce, and George Santayana, also in 1920, and a doctoral thesis on Baruch Spinoza in 1922. In his doctoral studies, McKeon's mentors were Frederick J. E. Woodbridge and John Dewey. From Woodbridge, McKeon would later write that he learned that "what philosophers meant might be comparable or even identical, despite differences in their modes of expression," while Dewey taught him how "to seek the significance of philosophic positions in the problems they were constructed to solve." He then studied philosophy at the University of Paris, where his teachers included Étienne Gilson, until he began teaching at Columbia in 1925.

In 1934, McKeon was appointed visiting professor of History at the University of Chicago, beginning a 40-year association with that university. The following year, he assumed a permanent position as professor of Greek philosophy, a post he filled for twelve years. As professor and, also starting in 1935, as Dean of the Humanities, McKeon was instrumental in developing the distinguished general education program of the Hutchins era at the University of Chicago. He later founded Chicago's interdisciplinary Committee on the Analysis of Ideas and Study of Methods. He presided over the Western division of the American Philosophical Association in 1952, and over the International Institute of Philosophy from 1953 to 1957. In 1966, he gave the Paul Carus Lectures. He retired in 1974.

He received the Quantrell Award.

McKeon was a figure in United Nations Educational, Scientific and Cultural Organization's (UNESCO) early years. He advised UNESCO when (1946–48) it studied the foundations of human rights and of the idea of democracy. These studies supplied much of the material for the drafting of the Universal Declaration of Human Rights in 1948. In 1954, under the auspices of UNESCO and the Indian Philosophical Congress, he conducted a series of eighteen roundtable discussions at Indian universities on human relations and international obligations.

McKeon was a scholar of medieval philosophy and the history of science. He was also a figure in the revival of rhetoric as an intellectual art, exploring the often problematic relation between philosophy and rhetoric. He taught Aristotle throughout his career, insisting that his was a Greek Aristotle, not one seen through the eyes of later philosophers writing in Latin. McKeon's interests later shifted from the doctrines of individuals to the dialectic of systems. He investigated pluralism, cultural diversity, and problems of communication and community, at a time when such subjects were less than fashionable.

McKeon was a founding member of the "Chicago school" of literary criticism because of his influence on several of its members (e.g., Wayne Booth). Notwithstanding, McKeon distanced himself from the Chicago school, which was mainly concerned with neo-Aristotelian poetic theory. As a pluralist, he wished to disassociate himself from any attempt to propagandize any particular ideology, philosophy, or theorist.

A series of three volumes of "Selected Writings" from his widely scattered articles is planned by The University of Chicago Press, of which Vol. 1 (Philosophy, Science and Culture, 1998) and Vol. 2 (Culture, Education and the Arts, 2005) have appeared. A collection of essays about McKeon, his pluralist philosophy, and its applications, Pluralism in Theory and Practice: Richard McKeon and American Philosophy (Eugene Garver and Richard Buchanan, eds.), was written and published by his students and colleagues in 2000.

== Critique of modern philosophy ==
McKeon holds that the Renaissance revolt against scholasticism involved Aristotle in an "associated discredit", and few outstanding modern philosophers took the pains to examine the grounds of the criticism or to re-examine the philosophy of Aristotle. He credits Leibniz and Hegel as exceptions. In 1941 he notes that "Aristotle has become a force again in contemporary discussions", and that his writings have "disclosed greater applicability in present-day philosophic problems than they have in centuries".

== Legacy ==
Former students of McKeon have praised him and proved influential in their own right, including novelist Robert Coover, authors Susan Sontag and Paul Goodman, theologian John Cobb, philosophers Richard Rorty and Eugene Gendlin, classicist and philosopher Kenneth A. Telford, sociologist and social theorist Donald N. Levine, anthropologist Paul Rabinow, literary theorist Wayne Booth, and poets Tom Mandel and Arnold Klein. He was also the father of the literary critic Michael McKeon. Richard McKeon and the Committee on the Analysis of Ideas and Study of Methods appear under a thin disguise in Robert M. Pirsig's Zen and the Art of Motorcycle Maintenance.

In her autobiographical book A Philosophical Testament, Marjorie Grene wrote of her 1944 departure from the University of Chicago: "McKeon had me fired."

=== New rhetoric ===
In the later stages of McKeon's academic career, he started giving more attention to world problems. He sought to improve individual disciplines as he felt that they were meant to improve mankind. McKeon argued that rhetoric should be renewed for the technological age, functioning as a productive art for addressing new problems and as an architectonic art for organizing knowledge and fostering more inclusive communities.

=== Cultural influence ===
McKeon was cited extensively in Marshall McLuhan's 1943 doctoral dissertation The Place of Thomas Nashe in the Learning of His Time (since published as McLuhan, Marshall (2006). The Classical Trivium. Corte Madera: Gingko Press. ISBN 1-58423-067-3.).

In Robert Pirsig's 1974 novel Zen and the Art of Motorcycle Maintenance, he is the "Chairman of the Committee".

== Bibliography ==
- 1928: The Philosophy of Spinoza: The Unity of His Thought.
- 1929: Selections from Medieval Philosophers
  - Vol. 1 Augustine to Albert the Great
  - Vol. 2 Roger Bacon to William of Ockham
- 1941: Aristotle (1941). Richard McKeon (ed.). The Basic Works of Aristotle. New York: Random House..
- 1947: Introduction to Aristotle.
- 1951: Democracy in a World of Tensions: A Symposium Prepared by UNESCO.
- 1952: Freedom and History: The Semantics of Philosophical Controversies and Ideological Conflicts.
- 1954: Thought, Action, and Passion. University of Chicago Press. Reprinted 1974.
- 1957: The Freedom to Read: Perspective and Program.
- 1959: The Edicts of Asoka. With N.A. Nikam. University of Chicago Press.
- 1971: Gli studi umanistici nel mondo attuale.
- 1976: Peter Abailard, Sic et Non: A Critical Edition.
- 1987: Rhetoric: Essays in Invention and Discovery. Edited with an introduction by Mark Backman. Oxbow Press. ISBN 0-918024-49-8
- 1990. Freedom and History and Other Essays: An Introduction to the Thought of Richard McKeon. Edited by Zahava K. McKeon. University of Chicago Press.
- 1994. On Knowing—The Natural Sciences. Edited by David B. Owen and Zahava K. McKeon. University of Chicago Press.
- 1998. Selected Writings of Richard McKeon, Vol. 1. McKeon, Zahava K., and William G. Swenson, eds. University of Chicago Press. ISBN 0-226-56036-8
- 2005. Selected Writings of Richard McKeon, Vol. 2. McKeon, Zahava K., and William G. Swenson, eds. University of Chicago Press. ISBN 0-226-56038-4

== See also ==
- American philosophy
