= Henry David Aiken =

American philosopher (1912–1982)

- Born: July 3, 1912; Portland, Oregon, U.S.
- Died: March 30, 1982 (aged 69); Cambridge, Massachusetts, U.S.
- Occupation: Philosopher

Henry David Aiken (1912–1982) was an American professor of philosophy.

== Life and career ==
Born July 3, 1912, Henry David Aiken was raised in Portland, Oregon. After graduating from Reed College in the same city in 1934, he continued onto Stanford University and Harvard University, where he received his master's (1937) and Ph.D. (1943), respectively, in philosophy.

In the mid-1940s, he taught philosophy at Columbia University and the University of Washington briefly before settling with Harvard for close to two decades (1946–1965). He continued to Brandeis University, where he stayed between 1965 and his retirement in 1980. Aiken retired as the Charles Goldman Professor of Philosophy and History of Ideas. His classes included the existentialism, modern ethics, and philosophy of history.

Aiken wrote fifteen books, including The Age of Ideology and Reason and Conduct. He was named a Guggenheim Fellow in 1960.

== Personal life ==
Aiken was married and had two sons, three daughters, and a stepson. He died March 30, 1982, in Cambridge, Massachusetts.
