= Book Review Digest =

American reference work and periodical

Title page of the digest's first volume, 1905

Book Review Digest is a reference work by H. W. Wilson Company that compiles recent book reviews. Printed monthly with annual compendia, it digests American and English periodicals from 1905 to the present day. Before the Internet, Book Review Digest was a significant reference tool and bibliographic aid used by the American public and librarians alike to find current literature. An online edition of the collection is offered in two subscription products: Book Review Digest Retrospective (1905–1982) and Book Review Digest Plus (1983 through present day).

== Description and usage ==
During the 20th century, Book Review Digest was a common American library bibliographic aid for the public to find current literature. The reference work compiles book reviews from major periodicals of the period beneath each book's bibliographic entry. Beginning in 1905, the H. W. Wilson Company issued Book Review Digest monthly, with cumulative compilations. By the 1950s, Book Review Digest covered 4,000 books annually.

Each book's bibliographic entry is introduced with a noncritical description, annotating discrete features with no assessment of quality. Beneath each is a digest of reviewer commentary in brief excerpt. Plus and minus symbols indicate the review's favorability, if apparent, letting readers quickly summarize critical consensus towards the book. (Generally, listed reviews tend towards praise.) Each volume additionally lists the review source publications, which are both American and English. For a sense of expansion over time, the 1905 volume had 386 pages while the 1948 volume had 1,067.

While also used to aid libraries in their acquisition selection, as a compilation of book reviews often published and compiled after the book's release, Book Review Digest was not as useful to acquisition librarians as the American Library Association's Booklist new book guide, which is based on short descriptions rather than compiled, printed reviews. Book Review Digest nevertheless was a mainstay for new book selection. Some libraries clip and paste each book's digested review summary within the reviewed book itself or in the library's card catalog.

== Print cumulative and index ==
Like other Wilson bibliographies, Book Review Digest was printed as a cumulative catalog. Issued as a monthly, Book Review Digest collected book reviews for each catalog entry, printing each month's new reviews alongside the reviews compiled in prior issues. When the issue became too expensive to print, twice a year, Wilson issued a cumulative list: a six-month cumulation in August, and a bounded, full-year annual in February. Wilson released a cumulative index, compiled continuously, every five years.

The cumulative format is based on the technical linotype print production technique. Each catalog entry is typeset as a linotype slug, i.e., a small metal bar, and can be kept in alphabetical order, simply adding reviews beneath each slug between monthly issues. This let the monthly issue remain current and uniform while building towards the annual cumulative volume.

Its subject–title index additionally classifies books by type or special interest. Fiction, for example, is divided into "Cheerful Stories", "Ghost Stories", "Historical Novels", "Mystery Novels", and "Novels of Locality" (with subdivisions), as well as groupings by theme, such as school or sex.

The 1905–1974 author/title index, published in 1976 across four volumes, alphabetically compiled bibliographic references for Book Review Digest's roughly 300,000 reviewed books in its first 75 years. It contains cross references for variant forms of each title and author.

== Digital ==
Wilson publishes its digest online as two products: Book Review Digest Retrospective and Book Review Digest Plus, respectively covering 1905–1982 and 1983 through the present day. At the time of their launch in the mid-2000s, Retrospective compiled 1.5 million reviews from over 500 English-language publications on 300,000 books published between 1905 and 1982. The equivalent of Book Review Digest's first 78 annual cumulative volumes, Retrospective replaced 14 linear feet of reference material. At its launch, Plus compiled over a million reviews from thousands of periodicals on 700,000 books published from 1983 through the present day. Updated daily, it also pulled reviews from other Wilson periodical databases, including Readers' Guide Full Text. Retrospective does not contain full text reviews, only excerpts up to 500 words. Plus extended coverage beyond general fiction and nonfiction reviews to include full-text reviews of reference works, children's books, and textbooks.

Wilson first released Plus online in 2003, followed by Retrospective two years later. Both were initially offered through Wilson's redesigned WilsonWeb online interface. Users had three modes of search: Basic, Advanced, and Browse. While Basic search let users use natural language and Boolean operators in a simple search box to search the database, the default mode was Advanced search, which let users select search fields by parameters like book title, book author, publication year, publisher, subject, and ISBN. Users could also filter by date and by type of text result (excerpt, full text, peer reviewed, or PDF), when available. The Browse mode let users navigate the database like an index. For retrieval, users could save, print, or email individual entries, which also saved in a search history. WilsonWeb features also included connection to the individual library's online public access catalogs, OpenURL interlibrary loan, multi-window pane navigation, citation formatting and citation manager export. While Book Review Digest had been available in some form on EBSCOhost, OCLC, and SilverPlatter platforms as early as July 2003, Plus was exclusive to WilsonWeb. EBSCO Publishing deprecated WilsonWeb upon acquiring the H. W. Wilson Company in 2011, with all Wilson databases being converted to the EBSCOhost platform.

Among initial reviews of Retrospective and Plus in WilsonWeb, Harvard College Library's Head of Instructional Services described the online catalog as "an essential acquisition for every public, academic, and research library" in 2006. Other called the catalogs powerful and exciting. Lack of a Retrospective search field for review source was an absence palpable among reviewers, who struggled to separate reviews by Choice, Booklist, and History from other uses of those keywords in a general search. The workaround of using ISSN search to identify the review source was not obvious. A 2003 Online magazine comparison between Plus and Amazon.com found that the latter was mostly sufficient for bestsellers, between Amazon's use of published reviews as well as their own. Amazon's customer reviewers were only worthwhile in the case of some specialized and technical books. Book Review Digest, on the other hand, only sourced professional opinions. While Amazon was quicker to post new excerpts and reviews since the late 1990s, Plus had 20 years of history. Plus also had a more robust search function and integration with library catalogs, but was only accessible through subscribing libraries whereas Amazon was accessible everywhere. While Plus was more complete, Amazon's accessibility and quickness provided for general audience needs.

== See also ==
- British National Bibliography

== Works cited ==
- Haines, Helen E. (1957). "Familiar Friends and Companions". Living with Books: The Art of Book Selection. New York: Columbia University Press. pp. 63–77. OCLC 580015.
