= Elder Olson =

American poet (1909–1992)

Elder James Olson
- Born: Elder James Olson; March 9, 1909; Chicago, Illinois, U.S.
- Died: July 25, 1992 (aged 83); Albuquerque, N.M., U.S.
- Education: University of Chicago (BA, MA, PhD)
- Occupations: Poet, literary critic

Elder James Olson (March 9, 1909 – July 25, 1992) was an American poet, teacher and literary critic.

He was born in Chicago, Illinois and attended Carl Schurz High School. As an undergraduate at the University of Chicago, he published a volume of poetry. Thereafter, he published multiple volumes of poetry and literary criticism during his career, for which he received multiple awards. After graduating with a BA in 1934, he was awarded an MA from the University of Chicago in 1935. The same year he received a Friends of Literature award. In 1937, he married Ann Elisabeth Jones and the couple had two children (Ann and Elder). He was awarded a Ph.D. in 1938 from the University of Chicago with the dissertation, General Prosody, Rhythmis, Metric, Harmonic.

He became a founder and leading figure of the so-called "Chicago school" of literary criticism. In 1942, he started teaching at the University of Chicago as an assistant professor in the Department of English. He divorced Ann Elisabeth Jones then married Geraldine Louise Hays in 1948, and they had two children: Olivia and Shelley. In 1955 he was presented with the Poetry Society of America Chap-book Award. He gained full professorship in 1955 and was named Distinguished Service Professor Emeritus of English in 1973. He received the Quantrell Award. During his career he traveled abroad several times as a visiting professor, but he remained a member of the university faculty until his retirement in 1977.

He died of pneumonia in Albuquerque, N. M. at the age of 83.

== Bibliography ==
- Last Poems (1984)
- On Value Judgment in the Arts, and Other Essays (1976)
- Olson's Penny Arcade (1975)
- The Theory of Comedy (1968)
- Aristotle's Poetics and English Literature (1965)
- Collected Poems (1963)
- American Lyric Poems (1963)
- Tragedy and the Theory of Drama (1961)
- Plays and Poems 1948–58 (1958)
- The Scarecrow Christ (1954)
- The Poetry of Dylan Thomas (1954)
- The Cock of Heaven (1940)
- Thing of Sorrow (1934)
- Poetry, A Magazine of Verse (1928)

== Awards ==
Among his many awards are the following:

- Schurz Alumni Hall of Fame (1978)
- Quantrell Award for Excellence in Undergraduate Teaching (1966)
- Poetry Society of America Chap-book Award (1955)
- Eunice Tiertjens Award for Poetry (1953)
- Friends of Literature Award (1935)
- Guarantor's Award (1931)
- Witter Bynner Award (1927)
