= EU KIDS Act =

Proposed European Union regulation

Regulation pending
- European Union regulation
- Title: EU KIDS Act

History
- Date made: 16 September 2026

The EU KIDS Act is a proposed regulation by the European Commission and the European Union that would prohibit children under 13 from social media accounts, require supervision for users aged between 13 and 15 as well as platforms being designed safe for users aged 15 to 17. The proposal would also require age verification for accounts and have covered platforms avoid addictive designs. Design obligations in the proposed regulation extend to social networking services, online video platforms, AI companions and chatbots, online games and operating systems, although not all design obligations apply to all services.

The EU Commission seeks feedback on this proposal until 3 December 2026.

== Background ==
In a Eurobarometer survey from July 2026, 63% of Europeans supported EU regulation of social media use by children, with the majority supporting a blanket ban as the mechanism.

== Response ==
Save the Children Fund and 5Rights Foundation have approved of the Kids Act's methodology, and their representatives were given opportunities to provide input to the European Commission via a special panel organised by Ursula von der Leyen.

However, digital rights organisations including EDRi have raised concerns over the Act potentially depriving children and adults of their freedom of speech and hindering their access to information, and have criticized the European Commission for not conducting a formal impact assessment as part of the proposal.

Academic criticism has been raised around the quality of the drafting of the Act, claiming that it has significant consequences and prohibitions that cannot have been intended by the European Commission due to the reuse of the broad definitions from the Digital Markets Act that were, in the contexts in which they were designed, used to identify candidate services for the European Commission to designate for regulation, rather than apply obligations to in a blanket manner. Criticism has also highlighted the lack of consideration in the proposal for how the regime would play out for complex or separated families, and in situations where adults seek to use the self-declaration of parenthood to control and surveil other adults as part of technology-facilitated intimate partner abuse. One surprising drafting omission appears to be that loot boxes are prohibited in every service except for online games, the main service in which they appear.

=== Video game sector ===
The proposal's coverage of online games drew criticism from video game preservation advocates and industry figures. Stop Killing Games, a consumer movement founded by YouTuber Ross Scott that campaigns against publishers making purchased games unplayable, described the Kids Act as the biggest threat it has faced. In a video published in late September 2026, Scott argued that the age verification requirements could be applied to individual online games and that the rules would effectively make private servers for unsupported games illegal, and called the proposal "the most draconian proposal I've ever seen regarding video games and consumers". He also argued that compliance costs would fall hardest on smaller studios and could shrink the European games market. The group urged supporters to lobby MEPs to reject the proposal and to instead add its preservation goals to the Digital Fairness Act. German outlet Mein-MMO noted that this reading is Stop Killing Games' own interpretation of the text, and MLex reported that the proposal's binding rules do not expressly cover games.

Epic Games CEO Tim Sweeney criticised the draft, arguing that it would restrict children's access to games with user-generated content tools such as Fortnite Creative and Roblox Studio. The trade body Video Games Europe was broadly supportive of the proposal but cautioned against "sweeping age assurance measures" applicable to every game and player, and called for the PEGI and USK ratings to become the standard for games in Europe.

== See also ==
- Online Safety Amendment (Social Media Minimum Age) Act 2024
- Decision 2026-911 (France)
- Online age verification laws by country
- Think of the children
