= The Digital Freedom Project Incorporated v. Commonwealth =

Pending case in the High Court of Australia

The Digital Freedom Project Incorporated v. Commonwealth of Australia;
- Court: High Court of Australia
- Argued: 3–4 November 2026
- Decided: Pending
- Docket nos.: S163/2025
- Transcript: 4 December 2025

Area of law
- Constitutional law Implied freedom to political communication

The Digital Freedom Project Incorporated v. Commonwealth of Australia (case number S163/2025) is a pending High Court of Australia case involving legal challenge to Australia's Online Safety Amendment (Social Media Minimum Age) Act 2024. The lawsuit was filed by the Digital Freedom Project along with two teenagers arguing that the law violates the implied freedom of political communication within Australia on 26 November 2025, two weeks before the law took effect on 10 December 2025.

On 4 December 2025 the High Court of Australia accepted the legal challenge to the amendment brought by the Digital Freedom Project agreeing to hear the case as early as February 2026. The similar Reddit, Inc. v Commonwealth of Australia was filed in the High Court on 12 December 2025, and a special case of the law compatbility with the implied freedom of political communication was referred to the Full Court on 29 July 2026.

== See also ==
- Online Safety Amendment (Social Media Minimum Age) Act 2024
- Online age verification laws by country
- List of High Court of Australia cases
- Decision 2026-911 (France)
