= Online age verification laws by country =

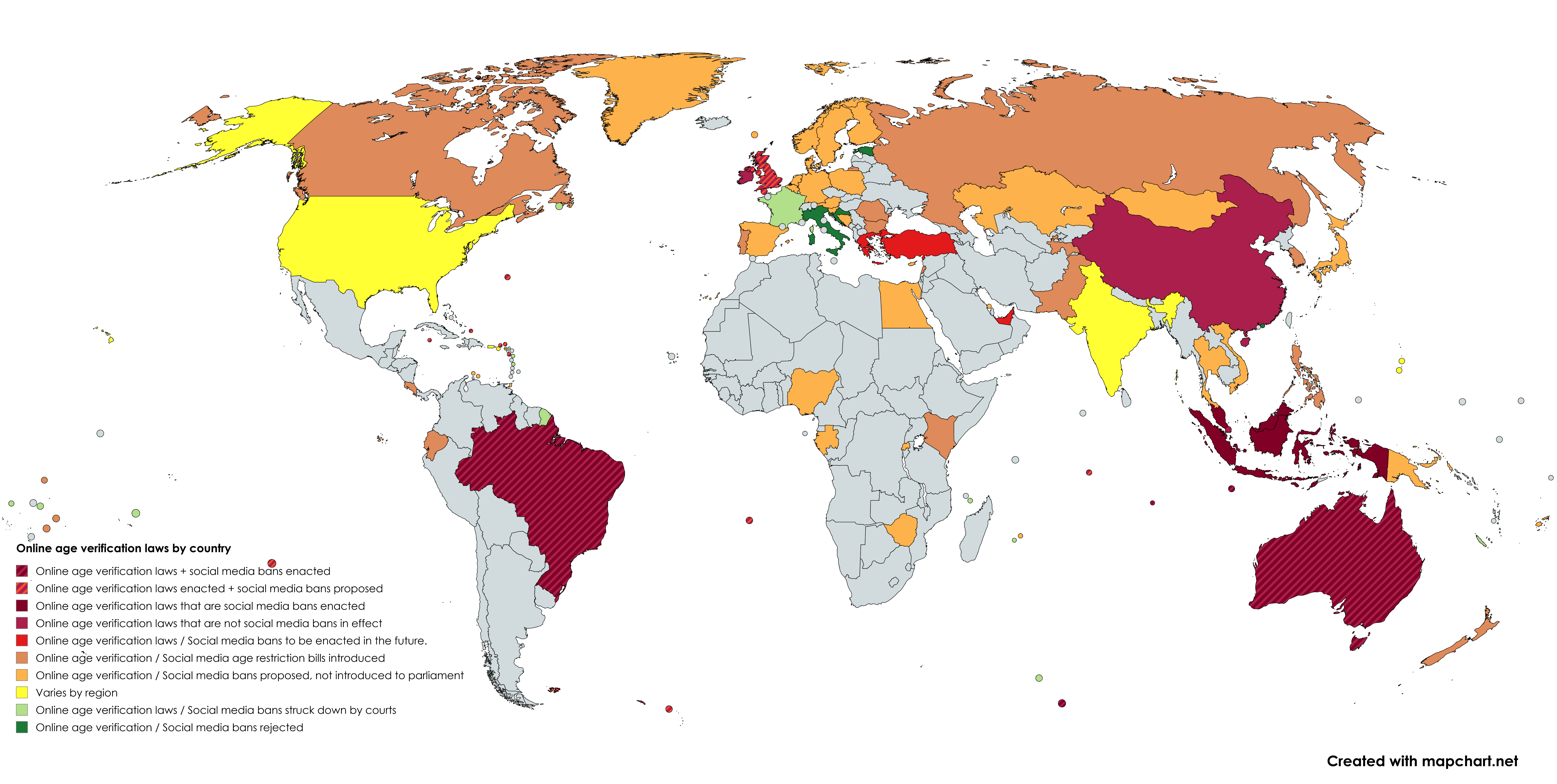
Online age verification laws by country as of November 2026

Since 2023, many countries and subdivisions across the globe have passed or proposed laws to require age verification for parts of the internet, including social media services, social networks, devices, and other digital services with the intention of protecting young people from harmful and illegal content. Most of the passed laws or bills have the age verification process done through handing over a government-issued ID, a facial scan or credit card over in order to prove that they are not underage, with the process done with third-party age verification providers.

These laws and proposals vary greatly, with some of them restricting access only to certain features or distinguishing between different users online, which could lead to companies requiring age verification to comply with such restrictions as the Kids Online Safety Act, or banning users under a certain age, which is the approach of the Online Safety Amendment in Australia which fully prohibits anyone under 16 years old from holding social media accounts. A few nations, such as Pakistan, have proposed punishing those who allow minors to access these services.

Despite these laws being introduced mostly for child protection reasons, they have received criticism and backlash from the general public and organizations that focus on digital and civil rights for normalizing mass surveillance and restricting freedom of speech through the elimination of anonymous accounts. Other organizations such as UNICEF have opposed these laws on grounds that such laws may backfire, constitute violations of freedom of speech and privacy rights, and because there are better ways of protecting children online.

These laws have also been bypassed by technologies such as VPNs, which have seen a significant amount of new users in countries where such laws are enforced. While these laws typically only apply in their respective countries, some online platforms have made their age verification policies global, such as Roblox and Discord, which require age verification for certain features to close said loopholes to avoid receiving a lawsuit.

== Background ==
There were attempts to enact online age verification laws before Australia's social media ban, such as the UK's Digital Economy Act 2017, which was passed on 27 April 2017, yet later went unenforced, South Korea's shutdown law, which was passed in 2011 and repealed in 2021, and Australia's Online Safety Act 2021, where age verification was planned but later scrapped. All of these attempts failed due to free speech concerns, large protests and outcry.

On 26 October 2023, the UK's Online Safety Act was passed and went into effect on 25 July 2025. In 2024, The Anxious Generation was published by Jonathan Haidt. This book then became the catalyst for Australia's Online Safety Amendment, which outlawed the usage of social media for individuals under 16. As a result of these laws and proposals, age verification laws subsequently started being introduced in other countries.

In the United States, legislation regarding social media age verification at the state level began in March 2023, when Utah passed the Utah Social Media Regulation Act. The bills, which were challenged due to First Amendment concerns, have not taken effect.

== Laws about social media age restrictions ==
Many of the laws regarding social media age verification revolve around setting a minimum age to have an account on social media platforms, with the youngest proposed minimum age set at 12 by Trinidad and Tobago (cf. the minimum age of the COPPA law from the United States, which is 13) and the oldest being 18 set by both the Philippines and Zimbabwe. Neither of these examples gives an exception with parental consent, with most countries (such as the UAE, Turkey and Greece) setting the minimum age at either 15 or (in Australia, Indonesia, Malaysia and Spain) at 16. Some of the proposed or passed laws that set a minimum age for social media allow exceptions with parental consent, such as those in Brazil (set minimum age of 16 with parental consent exception), Denmark (set minimum age of 15, parental consent from 13), Portugal and the European Union (set minimum age of 16 with parental consent from 13).

== Countries and subdivisions with laws in effect ==
=== Australia ===
In November 2024, Australia's federal parliament passed the Online Safety Amendment (Social Media Minimum Age) Act, which requires social media companies such as Facebook, Snapchat, TikTok and X (formerly Twitter) to take reasonable steps to prohibit minors under the age of 16 from owning accounts. YouTube was originally excluded; however, it was later included and companies that do not comply can be fined up to 50 million AUD and is enforced by the eSafety Commissioner. The ban came into effect on 10 December 2025. Australia then became the first country in the world to ban social media, banning platforms YouTube, TikTok, X, Facebook, Instagram, Snapchat, Twitch, Kick, Threads and Reddit for individuals under 16. This meant that anyone over 16 must verify their age using methods such as facial scan or ID in order to create, log in to or continue using accounts by 10 December 2025.

On 9 March 2026, Australia became the second country in the world to enforce age verification on social networks such as adult sites, search engines, online platforms like X that have allowed harmful content, online chats from Xbox, PlayStation and even on games such as GTA. Apps rated 18+ and AI Chatbots that allow explicit material also became affected by this enforced age verification.

In March 2026, it was reported that over 310,000 accounts owned by children under 16 have been deactivated and blocked by the age filters.

On 27 June 2026, the Australian government introduced amendments to strengthen enforcement of its under-16 social media ban, including increasing the maximum penalty for platforms that fail to take reasonable steps to exclude children to 99 million AUD and expanding the age verification to app stores. The proposed changes would also expand the powers of the eSafety Commissioner to compel documents and obtain information from platforms and third-party age verification providers. The amendments were referred to an eight-week Senate inquiry after opposition parties delayed their passage, meaning the increased penalties and expanded powers had not yet taken effect. The proposed changes followed reports that many children continued to access restricted platforms despite the ban, with eSafety reporting that 7 in 10 children still held accounts on restricted platforms when the ban began on services including Facebook, Instagram, Snapchat and TikTok.

In August 2026, Microsoft announced that gamers may have to verify their age to purchase video games on the Xbox store rated R18+, with the age verification process handled by Yoti.

=== Brazil ===
In September 2025, Brazil passed the Digital Statute for Children and Adolescents that would require social media companies to implement age verification and link accounts under 16 with their parents and only allow children access to content that is intended for them. The law also requires parental consent to download apps for underage individuals aged between 12 and 18 years old and bans lootboxes in video games similar to a law enacted in Belgium in 2018, with the exception that it also bans digital rewards, the digital receiving of either virtual or real money, and in-app purchases. If platforms do not comply, they can be fined up to 50 million BRL.

The law came into effect on 17 March 2026, resulting in Brazil becoming the second country overall, and the first non-English-speaking and Latin American country to ban social media and all online platforms and social networking services, which includes various live-streaming and social media platforms such as VK, Telegram, Bilibili, among others, for individuals under 16 without parental consent, and forces them to verify their age through ID or facial scans. It also became the third country in the world to enforce age verification on social networks such as adult sites, search engines, online platforms like X which allow harmful content, online chats from Xbox, PlayStation, and even on games such as GTA and mobile apps rated 18+. Due to the law banning lootboxes, digital rewards, in-app purchases, and the digital receiving of virtual or real money for those under 18, many video games and apps such as Roblox, Minion Rush, Mario Kart Tour, EA Sports FC, Counter Strike, Genshin Impact, Fortnite have restricted in-app purchases or even entire games for non-verified users.

=== China ===
China already has its own strict Internet censorship, such as the Great Firewall that blocks certain foreign websites including YouTube, Wikipedia, and Google, as well as the restriction of VPNs that bypass these blocks. Laws mandating ID and real-name verification have also been enacted in the country. These laws must be followed in order to create accounts on platforms such as Bilibili, Douyin, and Kuaishou. Since 2 August 2023, China has adopted the Youth Anti-Addiction System, also known as Minor Mode, which cuts off internet access for individuals under 18 between 22:00 and 6:00. Time limits include up to 40 minutes for those under 8, 1 hour for those aged 8–15, and 2 hours maximum for 16-17 year olds per day. Minor Mode came into force in January 2024. Since September 2021, those under 18 will only be allowed to play online games on weekends and legal holidays between 20:00 and 21:00.

=== European Union (age verification) ===
In compliance with the EU's Digital Service Act, and the Republic of Ireland's Online Safety Code, the social media platform X has taken steps to lock "certain types" of content behind age verification since 28 July 2025. These steps include the assurance of one's age based on extant indications such as account creation dates, legacy verification and prior acts of age verification. Alternatively, when these indications do not exist, email addresses and social connections are used to estimate age. The platform has also planned two user-involved "secure, privacy-respecting" options that will give one a choice of either taking a live selfie or submitting a government ID, both of which will estimate their age. These measures are expected to arrive in the coming weeks. Vimeo has also blocked users in the European Union from accessing certain features or types of content not suitable for younger audiences without age verification in September 2025, in order to protect these younger audiences from accessing "potentially harmful" content.

In January 2026, TikTok announced plans to introduce age verification technology in the European Union within the coming weeks, with its system being based on the analysis of behavioural signals, profile information, and posted videos, in order to better comply with regional regulations and to better distinguish and ban accounts belonging to those under 13. Flagged accounts, rather than being spontaneously banned upon detection, will be reviewed by specialist moderators. Ban appeals will be done by an age-estimating facial scan, provided by digital identification service company Yoti, as well as the presentation of one's credit card and government ID.

In July 2026, Reddit blocked European users under the age of 18 from accessing posts and subreddits marked as NSFW, as well as preventing users between the ages of 13 to 17 from using certain features such as profile visibility and followers. For those aged 13 to 15, restrictions on these aforementioned features are "locked to their most protective configuration" and cannot be changed. Those aged 16 to 17 have the same restrictions placed on them by default; however these individuals are able to manually modify these restrictions via account settings. Ad personalisation and chat are locked by default for every account that is in the age range of 13 to 17. If age cannot be defined via "existing signals", there are two ways for users to verify their age. One way involves the submission of a government ID or a self-taken photograph for age-estimation through Persona, while the other requires the confirmation of one's age through an Apple or Google account. That same month, a European Citizens' Initiative called “Stop Killing the Internet: No Digital ID & No Age Verification” was registered by the European Commission. The Initiative is similar to the Stop Killing Games movement, which has also criticised these age verification laws along with it, and has demanded anonymous or pseudonymous age verification and the minimisation of data collection, as well as advocating for legislation for citizens to identity themselves only when absolutely necessary. Organisers of Stop Killing the Internet called for legislation that ensures “voluntary, privacy-friendly, and non-discriminatory” age verification and digital identification systems.

=== Indonesia ===
In early 2025, the government of Indonesia had been looking into the idea of setting a minimum age to use social media as well as other protections that would be similar to Australia's. This proposal had been met with support and caution by the public.

On 28 March 2026, Indonesia banned social media for children under the age of 16, becoming the first non-Western, Asian and Muslim country and the third country in the world to enforce a social media ban. Platforms such as YouTube, TikTok, X (formerly known as Twitter), Facebook, Instagram, Threads, Roblox and Bigo Live were the first to be banned with measures similar to Australia. Enforcement and account deactivation will be rolled out gradually, affecting all accounts that are reported to be under 16.

As of July 2026, around 600,000 YouTube accounts and 4.1 million TikTok accounts, or a total of 4.7 million social media accounts combined that are reportedly owned by children under 16 have been terminated in Indonesia.

=== Malaysia ===
In November 2025, the Malaysian Communications Minister Fahmi Fadzil announced that starting 1 January 2026, all social media platforms would have to ban all users under 16 years of age and implement age verification via eKYC, saying this was in line with the country's Online Safety Act, which was enacted in 2025 and took effect the same day the ban does. The effective date was later changed to 1 June 2026 from 1 January 2026. Malaysia then became the second Asian and Muslim country, and fourth country in the world to ban social media and online platforms that have more than 8 million users for individuals under 16 on 1 June 2026, with measures also similar to Australia. Targeted platforms with over 8 million users included platforms such as YouTube, TikTok, Facebook and Instagram.

=== Republic of Ireland ===
The Online Safety Code is a law in force in the Republic of Ireland. The law addresses video content, which includes audiovisual programmes, user generated video, audiovisual commercial communications, and integral user-generated content, which include examples such as comments and comments associated with video content. The law also requires the protection of children from adult-only video content, which include pornography and excessive violence, video and audiovisual commercial content that can impair their physical, mental, and moral health, and audiovisual commercial content that can directly persuade children strongly to buy or hire a product or service via exploiting their inexperience and naïveté, encourage children to convince their parents or other adults to purchase advertised goods or services, exploit trust placed in parents, teachers, or others, and unreasonably show children in dangerous situations, and the general public to be protected from content that incites hatred and violence, encourages terrorism, racism, or xenophobia, disseminates illegal material such as child sexual abuse material, and promotes bullying, harassment, prejudice, and behaviour characterising eating or feeding disorders. The Online Safety Code was developed so that video-sharing platform service (VSPS) providers would take action to protect children and the general public, as well as in response to a report regarding the harm of video-sharing platform services, the PA Harms Report, with one of the measures including providing content rating, age verification and or parental control systems.

=== Singapore ===
On 1 April 2026, app stores in the country started being required by the Infocomm Media Development Authority (IMDA) to prevent users estimated to be under 18 years of age from downloading apps with inappropriate content. App stores do this by checking a user's government ID or using facial scans. This made Singapore the second country to enforce age verification on app stores, with targeted companies including Apple, Google, Microsoft, Huawei and Samsung.

=== Turkey ===
Turkey's Grand National Assembly, along with the country's president, Recep Tayyip Erdoğan, has been discussing a draft law that would ban social media for minors under 15 and provide parental controls for minors who are 15 to 17, as well as require social media platforms to implement age and identity verification to prevent minors under 15 from becoming users of social media. Along with this, the draft law proposes making it easier to remove problematic content and implementing measures to make bypassing the restrictions with a VPN harder. The draft law has already been accepted by the commission and now must pass the Grand National Assembly of Turkey. The Grand National Assembly passed the law in April 2026, and was published in the Official Gazette of Turkey on 1 May 2026, after which, it would take effect six months after publication.

The law took effect on 1 November. Turkey then became the first country in the world to ban social media use for children under 15 and the third country in Asia to ban platforms such as YouTube, Instagram, Facebook and TikTok. Age verification is required for making new accounts after this date, while existing social media accounts are not affected until 31 March 2027. The age verification process is done with e-Devlet.

=== United Kingdom ===
The United Kingdom became the first country in the world on 25 July 2025 to enforce age verification under the Online Safety Act 2023, which although does not set an age limit for social media, requires providers of "user-to-user" services (which includes many popular social media services) to prevent access by children of content deemed harmful, including but not limited to pornographic content, self-harm, suicide, or eating disorders. Platforms including Reddit, X, Discord, Vimeo, Spotify, and Bluesky have implemented age verification for UK users for harmful and sensitive content as a result.

The UK became the first country in the world to expand age verification to social networking platforms and services such as adult sites, search engines, online platforms like X that have allowed inappropriate content, online chats from Xbox, PlayStation, and even online games such as GTA Online. "Vile and illegal content created by AI" also became a target of this enforced age verification, which also included a ban on sexualised images without one's consent.

On 17 June 2026, Keir Starmer announced that the Children's Wellbeing and Schools Act 2026 has passed, which puts a ban on children under 16 having accounts and accessing social media apps such as Snapchat, TikTok, Instagram, Facebook, X and YouTube, effective from March 2027, due to these apps allowing underaged users to be exposed to sexual abuse, infinite scrolling, dangerous trends, blackmail, and bullying. This ban has been described as an “Australia Plus” ban, as it, just like its Australian counterpart, targets those under 16. A curfew was also proposed that voluntarily limits access to these affected social media platforms for those aged between 16 and 17 between 00:00 and 06:00, similar to the South Korean shutdown law. The ban also blocks strangers from talking to minors by default and blocks livestreams for those under 16, in order to "prevent a cliff-edge at 16," as said by the government.

In September 2026, the communications regulator Ofcom launched an investigation into Aylo, the parent company of the adult video-sharing platform Pornhub, over whether or not the site has prevented children from viewing pornographic and adult content. Ofcom expressed concern that Aylo “may not have conducted sufficient due diligence and testing” before enforcing its age assurance process on Pornhub, which was implemented in May and is reliant on the age verification technology of Apple. Ofcom has stated that it will not be investigating Apple on how it operates its age checks.

==== Bailiwick of Guernsey ====
In December 2025, the Committee for Home Affairs reviewed the application of age verification laws to locally accessed adult sites in the Crown Dependency. A spokesman for the Committee has stated that it was “reviewing the online safety bill and will be considering what elements might be appropriate to extend to Guernsey”. The President of the Committee for Home Affairs, Marc Leadbeater, has expressed support for banning the social media app Snapchat for individuals under 16.

In August 2026, campaigners from organisations within Guernsey and the rest of the United Kingdom proposed suggestions on how the Crown Dependency could safeguard children from accessing online content that is harmful. These suggestions included the simultaneous operation of two different networks, one network for adults and the other designated as “child-safe”, and not allowing children to have possession of mobile phones that are “internet-capable”. Deputy Sally Rochester has noted the lack of discussion regarding online safety laws in Guernsey, stating: “I find it interesting with the online protection we provide our young people with, that it is not more of a conversation in our community here in Guernsey”. Cyber security consultant Daniel Card expressed concerns that if online safety laws similar to those implemented in the UK were introduced to Guernsey, they could still be circumvented via the usage of VPNs. Emma Lawlor, a campaigner for the organisation “Smartphone Free Childhood Guernsey” has called for a “brick phone” (i.e. a phone that is not “internet-capable) policy as an alternative to age verification and expressed concerns over the lack of enforcement of online safety laws, saying: “We do not feel putting effort into age-restrictions, curfews or VPNs is really the way to go — with any of these things, enforcement is a massive issue”.

==== Jersey ====
In November 2025, the Economic Development Minister of Jersey, Kirsten Morel, announced that legislation allowing people of all ages to remove “harmful content” was “in progress” inside the government and being drafted, in response to a report that revealed that there was no age verification in the Crown Dependency. A speech was made by deputy Catherine Curtis on 11 November, where she verified the lack of age verification laws in Jersey, stating: “we checked whether they were also in place in Jersey and they were not”. As of September 2026, yet more information is yet to be provided on this proposed law.

=== United States (state level) ===
There is no online age verification law that has been enacted at the federal level in the United States. Many states have enacted their own laws; however, most have been pending, have not yet, or have never taken effect. Notable exceptions to this are Florida, Mississippi, Tennessee, and Ohio.

Some platforms such as Pornhub and Newgrounds have blocked entire website access for states where age verification laws are enforced.

Florida's law took effect on November 25, 2025, after the 11th Circuit Court of Appeals ruled 2-1 to overturn a preliminary injunction blocking its enforcement. Florida's law bans social media for minors under 14 and require parental consent for minors aged 14 or 15. Florida would enforce its law against TikTok on June 15, 2026, after which TikTok would announce it would suspend accounts from users under 14 in the State of Florida. Florida then became the first state in United States to enforce a social media ban for minors. In October 2026, the 11th Circuit Court of Appeals ruled in Computer & Communications Industry Association v. Uthmeier that Florida's restrictions on minors' social media accounts likely satisfied intermediate scrutiny under the First Amendment. The court reversed a preliminary injunction and remanded the case for further proceedings.

Mississippi's law took effect on July 17, 2025, after the 5th Circuit Court of Appeals allowed the law to take effect pending appeal. However, an explanation was not given why. The law, known as the Walker Montgomery Protecting Children Online Act, requires parental consent for users under 18 and requires platforms to prevent minors from view certain types of content. Bluesky announced in August 2025 that they would block users in Mississippi due to the law.

Ohio's law, known as the Social Media Parental Notification Act, would take effect on June 18, 2026, after the 6th Circuit Court of Appeals would rule 2-1 that the law was constitutional. The law requires parental consent for users under 16.

The law in Tennessee, known as the Protecting Kids From Social Media Act, took effect on January 1, 2025. A judge for the U.S District Court for the Middle District of Tennessee, Eli J. Richardson, would allow the law to take effect on June 18, 2025, because NetChoice, the ones challenging the law, did not show evidence that the law would be enforced against them. The law requires parental consent for users under 18.

A law in Texas, known as the App Store Accountability Act or SB 2420, came into effect on June 4, 2026 after the federal injunction that blocked it was lifted. This law requires age verification for creating Apple accounts after it came into effect, with the age verification done through methods such as handing over a government-issued ID or a credit card. Texas then became the first state in the United States to enforce age verification onto app stores.

== Effect on platforms, companies and organizations ==
=== Discord ===
Despite many lawsuits in recent years for failing to protect children from predators online as well as moderation failures, since early 2024, Discord began to blur out sensitive and harmful content. If anyone wants to unblur these types of content, they can click the eye icon to reveal said blurred content. However, since July 2025, Discord has locked the aforementioned sensitive and harmful content, including inappropriate material, behind age verification via ID for those residing in the UK to comply with the Online Safety Act 2023. This age verification measure then rolled out in Australia by 10 December 2025, then in Brazil by 17 March 2026, which included a ban for individuals under 16 without parental consent.

In late 2025, Discord had expanded age verification to include direct messages (DMs) from people who are not on one's friends list, which are automatically locked and sent to a separate "Message Requests" folder, of which this restriction cannot be disabled or moved to the main inbox without age verification and are restricted from speaking on Stage Channels in public servers without age verification.

In February 2026, Discord announced its teen safety protections, which would be rolled out to its user base worldwide. These protections make it impossible to bypass using bypassing mechanisms such as VPNs and will include YouTube-style automated age detection to flag user behaviour as "teen-appropriate", similar to methods employed by Instagram. Originally, these protections were supposed to come into force by March, but due to backlash over recent leaks of 70,000 user ID photos that happened in September 2025, it was delayed to the second half of 2026. The teen safety protections went into effect on 23 September 2026.

=== Google ===
The Play Age Signals API for Google Play started returning age signals for users in Brazil as a result of their age verification law taking effect on 17 March 2026. Age signals have also been returned to users in the U.S. state of Texas, more specifically to those "eligible users" who have created a Google Play account after May 28, 2026, in order to comply with SB 2420, also known as the App Store Accountability Act.

=== Linux distributions ===
Garuda Linux, in their March 2026 statement, condemned the Californian and Brazilian laws that mandate age verification on the operating system level. They asserted they would not implement OS-level age verification, claiming that their servers and donation fund repository are not based in jurisdictions that mandate OS-level age verification. TNE, a team member of Garuda Linux, further claimed that some of their maintainers had faced personal attacks for their contributions and could face the threats of either outstanding fines or jail time if they ignore court orders. Arch Linux restricted their Brazilian users' access in response to the Digital Statute for Children and Adolescents.

A Linux distribution known as Ageless Linux was released that same month as a protest against online age verification laws in the United States. It added to the debate among Linux developers about the risks of the laws on privacy and data security.

=== Meta Platforms ===
In May 2026, Meta Platforms, which owns various social media services such as Facebook, Instagram, WhatsApp, Threads and Messenger, announced plans to roll out age verification to users suspected too young to use services such as the previously mentioned Facebook and Instagram. According to Secretary Henry Aguda of the Philippine Department of Information and Communications Technology, Meta promised to implement age and identity verification using Philippine national identity card if the earlier implementation on Roblox worked. Aguda claimed they "understood" the "technical complexity" because it would be the first time the tech company would integrate a sovereign national identity as a prerequisite in using their services. Meta asserted that they might require same means of identity verification in 170 other jurisdictions. Aguda said the tech company would bring their "technical working team" in the country to study the proposal.

=== PEGI ===
On 12 March 2026, due to the passage of many laws across the globe regarding the age restriction of lootboxes, in-app purchases and simulated gambling features, such as Australia raising the age rating for video games featuring lootboxes to have an M rating, in other words being only recommended to those 15 and older and assigning a R 18+ rating for video games featuring simulated gambling on 22 September 2024, as well as Brazil passing the Digital Statute for Children and Adolescents, also known as the Felca Law in September 2025, which outlaws lootboxes for individuals under 18, the Pan European Game Information, or PEGI for short, a video game rating system based in Europe, introduced "interactive risk categories", designed to address predatory monetization and engagement mechanics in video games, which raises the age rating of games to have a PEGI 16 rating for containing lootboxes or other "paid random items", such as card packs, gacha systems, and prize wheels, and a PEGI 18 rating for having purchase systems involving NFTs or other mechanisms associated with blockchain and "unrestricted communication features". Games will also receive a PEGI 12 rating for FOMO mechanics and a PEGI 7 or 12 rating for engagement retention. This system came into force by June 2026 and will only apply to newer games like EA Sports FC 27. After June 2026, older games that have already been rated before this change, such as Fortnite, Genshin Impact, Roblox, and Apex Legends, will be initially excluded. However, if these games make certain changes, an example being the introduction of lootboxes, they may be subject to re-rating.

=== Roblox ===
Despite many lawsuits in recent years for failing to protect children from predators online as well as moderation failures leading to numerous countries imposing restrictions or outright banning the platform, such as Turkey in August 2024, Roblox has recently added a plethora of safety features. However, despite these additions, countries are still pursuing investigations against it. On 19 November 2025, Roblox announced that it would require users to verify their age to be able to use the chat in-game. This system places users into age groups, and players can only chat with people in neighboring age groups. Roblox's age verification is done by scanning a user's face to estimate their age, or having them upload a picture of their ID. Both methods are done with Persona.

In June 2026, the platform introduced more age-based restrictions by dividing user accounts into different tiers: Roblox Kids, which is assigned to users under the age of 9, Roblox Select, which is assigned to users age 9 to 15, and standard Roblox, which is assigned to users 16 and above. If a user does not verify their age, they are restricted to only playing games with an age rating of 9+ or lower. It was also recently announced that, along with a number of other restrictions, age verification will be required to publish a game on the platform.

Citing high risk, Indonesia restricted the platform for users under 16 under its social media ban on 28 March 2026, and Brazil restricted the platform for users under 16 on 17 March 2026. Formerly, Brazil restricted the platform to users under 18 due to the country's ban on lootboxes for users under 18; however, after the platform announced it would regulate lootboxes, Brazil lowered the limit to 16. Roblox has a deadline in October to implement the age verification system for the use of the platform in the Philippines through the use of the Philippine national identity card.

=== Wikimedia Foundation ===
With respect to the Online Safety Act 2023 of the United Kingdom, the Wikimedia Foundation argued that age verification would "violate our commitment to collect minimal data about readers and contributors" and that they might pull out from the UK, disabling access from the UK readers in the process. The High Court of Justice in 2025 rejected the foundation's legal challenge against the law. Nevertheless, Judge Jeremy Johnson asserted that this rejection "does not give Ofcom and the Secretary of State a green light to implement a regime that would significantly impede Wikipedia's operations". The foundation narrowly escaped the "Category 1" service classification under the law on July 10, 2026, though the regulator asserted that Wikipedia remained on the "watch list", which the foundation claimed as "an existential threat".

The organization also called for "balancing of legal measures" with regards to the Digital Statute for Children and Adolescents of Brazil, asserting the need for "exceptions" to "online encyclopedias, educational services, and other public interest platforms". They claimed "mandatory age verification poses significant risks to human rights, including privacy, freedom of expression, and access to reliable information".

=== YouTube ===
On 30 July 2025, Google announced that it would begin to enforce "age assurance" policies for selected users in the United States as a trial. Machine learning will be used to determine the age of the user, regardless of any account information that indicates their age, and restrict access to certain content and features across all Google properties, including YouTube (including, in particular, disabling personalised advertising and enabling certain digital wellbeing limits), if they are assumed to be under 18. On YouTube, this will be based on factors such as searches and video history, and the age of the account. The user must go through age verification via payment, scanned ID, or selfie to access all features if they are detected to be a minor. This faced severe backlash for unintentionally flagging users as minors, leading to restrictions on commenting, publishing public posts that are set to private by default, monetising, and having watch history without ID verification.

In some EU member states starting in September 2020, YouTube introduced age verification under the Audiovisual Media Services Directive, an EU law directive that requires platforms to age restrict content.

YouTube has protested against the British and Australian social media bans and proposals.

== Africa ==
=== Egypt ===
In January 2026, Egypt's parliament debated legislation discussing children's use of social media. On 25 January 2026, the House of Representatives announced its intent to introduce legislation regulating children's use of social media networks. Prior to that, President Abdel Fattah El Sisi had appeared on television urging lawmakers to restrict children's use of social media "until they reach an age when they can handle it properly." As of June 2026, no law has yet been introduced.

=== Gabon ===
On 8 April 2026, Gabon published an ordinance regulating social media platforms. Among the requirements would be that social media platforms would have to implement age verification and set a digital age of majority of 16 and platforms could only allow minors under 16 to have an account with parental consent. The age verification process, unlike that of many other countries, would require any person who wants to join a platform to provide their name, address, and personal identification number; this goes further than the requirements of other countries, which only require obtaining the verified age of a person.

Gabon's High Authority for Communication fully blocked social media in February 2026 due to false information, cyberbullying and data collection practices.

=== Kenya ===
In May 2025, the Communication Authority of Kenya published guidelines on online safety for children. One of the requirements of these guidelines was to require Application Service Providers (ASP) and Content Service Providers (CSP) to have age verification to restrict harmful content. Alongside this, the Kenya Parliament introduced the Kenya Information and Communications (Amendment) Bill, 2025, which requires age verification for social media services such as Facebook and WhatsApp. However, as of August 2025, the bill proposed by the Parliament has not passed and the status of the guidelines by the Communications Authority remains unclear.

On 17 February 2026, Kenyan members of parliament ruled out a ban on TikTok due to the platform providing communication, creativity, and entrepreneurship among youth. The proposed ban also infringed on fundamental rights, specifically the freedom of speech, and stifled economic growth. This led to the country resorting to regulating the app instead, with two of its ministers expecting to report to the House on how to strengthen age verification, as well as data localization and media literacy on privacy and responsible use of social media.

=== Mauritius ===
In September 2025, the Minister of Information Technology, Communication and Innovation, Avinash Ramtohul, stated that they were trying to foster a healthy and favourable digital environment for young people. On 12 December 2025, the Information and Communication Technologies Authority published a directive for the deployment of child online protection measures.

=== Morocco ===
In October 2026, the government of Morocco included plans as part of its 2026-2031 program to introduce legislation to ban children under 15 from social media platforms and online games deemed hazardous to minors. As of November 2026, no legislation has been introduced.

=== Nigeria ===
On 10 March 2026, Bosun Tijani, who is the head of the Federal Ministry of Communications, Innovation and Digital Economy announced a public consultation on possible restrictions on social media to help strengthen child safety with the possibility that the Nigerian Government considers strengthening age verification for social media platforms or sets a minimum age on them, however as of May 2026, no minimum age or age verification requirement has been set and is still in the consideration phase with the government stating they will rely on evidence based policies.

=== Rwanda ===
On 29 April 2026, the Minister of Information Communications Technology and Innovation, Paula Ingabire, said that "relevant institutions" within the Rwandan government are working together on drafting a proposed law that will forbid children under 16 from using social media. Authorities said that the law is part of a greater initiative to create a safer environment for Rwandan children.

=== Zimbabwe ===
On 8 March 2026, the Zimbabwe Minister of Information Communication Technology, Postal and Courier Services, Tatenda Mavetera, announced that the country would look into a ban on access to social media platforms for minors under 18 years of age as the country considers regulating social media platforms. The proposal was criticized as Zimbabwe has already existing online safety laws such as the Zimbabwe Data Protection Act, and that enforcing them would be better than blanket under-18 bans.

== Asia ==
=== Bahrain ===
Since January 2026, Bahrain has been considering prohibiting social media accounts for users younger than 15 within the country and would require platforms to put certain safeguards in place for children between 15 and 17 years old to help limit exposure to harmful content. The draft law is an amendment to the Child Law No 37 of 2012 in Bahrain.

=== India ===
In 2025, the ZEP Foundation petitioned the Supreme Court of India for social media regulation. The court denied the request to ban children under 13 from social media saying it was something for the Parliament to do and not the courts. However, the foundation's request to propose to the Central Government that it require age verification for social media and prohibit usage for those under 16 or 18 years old was granted and given an 8-week deadline; however as of September 2025, no laws have passed that resemble what the petition requested in India.

On 31 January 2026, an ally of the Indian Prime Minister Narendra Modi, lawmaker L.S.K. Devarayalu, proposed a bill to ban social media for children under 16. The bill is called the "Social Media (Age Restrictions and Online Safety) Bill", and states that no person under the age of 16 "shall be permitted to create, maintain, or hold" a social media account. Those persons in violation of this bill (i.e., those who have been discovered to have possession of an account) should have their accounts disabled. Devarayalu states that "Not only are our children becoming addicted to social media, but India is also one of the world's most largest producers of data for foreign platforms".

==== Andhra Pradesh ====
In April 2026, the government of Andhra Pradesh announced that it was drafting a law to bar children under 13 from using social media. Age verification may be done via the use of mechanisms such as "age tokens", which will be integrated with DigiLocker, the national cloud digitization service, enabling online platforms to authenticate a user's age without compromising their privacy. The state's IT minister, Nara Lokesh, had been leading a group of ministers to oversee this draft, and has called for legislation that "balances digital access with child safety, creativity and mental well being".

==== Goa ====
The state of Goa has been considering implementing a social media ban for children similar to Australia's. The state's IT minister, Rohan Khaunte, has stated that "If possible, (we will) implement a similar ban on children below 16 for usage of social media", also adding that details about the ban will follow.

==== Karnataka ====
On 6 March 2026, the state Chief Minister, Siddaramaiah, announced a ban on social media for children under 16 to prevent the adverse effects of rising mobile use among children. Siddaramaiah did not mention when the ban would take effect and as of August 2026, it still has not been enforced.

=== Japan ===
In June 2026, an advisory panel of the Ministry of Internal Affairs and Communications proposed a draft set of measures that would limit the access of underage persons to social networking services. These measures called for stricter age verification laws, but also rejected the enactment of a unified age verification law similar to Australia's, which it called "undesirable".

=== Kazakhstan ===
Kazakhstan is considering a social media ban for minors under 16 years of age similar to Australia's. However, this proposed law does not set an effective date.

=== Lebanon ===
On 27 February 2026, a draft law was submitted by Member of Parliament Tony Frangiegh that would ban social media use for individuals under 14. The Minister of Information, Paul Morcos, has also called for a national plan to regulate how children use mobile apps and the internet.

=== Mongolia ===
In February 2026, the Mongolian Minister of Education, Purevsuren Naranbayar, was reportedly working on a draft law that would ban children under 16 years of age from using what was defined as age restricted social media platforms, similar to Australia's law. Before the introduction of the draft law in Mongolia in 2025, a group led by his advisor was studying similar social media restriction laws that were enacted in other countries, which included not only Australia, but various European countries as well.

=== Pakistan ===
In July 2025, a bill was introduced in the Pakistan Senate that would ban social media for minors under 16 and require platforms affected by the bill to implement age verification. However, unlike other bills introduced or passed in countries such as Australia, these penalties only apply to online platforms. The Pakistani version of this bill, which bans underage individuals under 16 also imprisons anyone who makes a social media account for these individuals for up to 6 months, making Pakistan the first country in the world to introduce criminal offence penalties related to underage access to social media. The bill, however, was later withdrawn in August 2025 after controversy; however, the Pakistani Government is still looking to implement a lower age limit of 13 or 14 for social media access and remove the imprisonment penalty.

=== Philippines ===
Calls to introduce a social media ban for minors emerged after the deadly 2026 Tacloban school shooting. Legislators also proposed mandatory age verification for "violent and mature-rated online games". Renewed support came after the 2026 Ateneo de Zamboanga University shooting, which resulted in the deaths of an underaged victim and the underaged suspect. There were also calls to ban children from online games and websites "that promote graphic, violent, and distressing crime-related content, including the True Crime Community".

==== Legislative measures ====
The Senate of the Philippines approved Senate Bill No. 2424 on October 8, 2026, also known as the Safe Media Access and Responsible Technology for Kids in Digital Spaces (SMART KIDS) Act. Sponsored by Senator Robin Padilla, it aims to prohibit everyone below the age of 18 from using social media. It also mandates all international social media platforms to cooperate with the government in protecting children from harmful content and to appoint a local representative to deal with these content. Senator Joel Villanueva voiced his support for the bill, stating that "protection should extend to the screens, where a single click can expose the children to bullying, violence, and exploitation". Senator Risa Hontiveros, the only senator who voted against the bill, denounced the bill's very broad scope of age restrictions and suggested "tiered implementation for social media access". She argued that adolescents aged 13 and 15 "have different levels of development".

The House of Representatives approved their counterpart measure, House Bill 11566 or the Safe and Friendly Environment for Kids in Digital Spaces (SAFE KIDS) Act, on October 12, 2026. This version prohibits everyone aged 12 and below from having social media and online gaming accounts while allowing the adolescents below 18 years old to maintain social media accounts with parental consent. All adolescents should not access restricted features like "harmful or prohibited content, behavioral profiling, unnecessary collection or sharing of personal information, purchases, gambling-like mechanisms, targeted advertising, recommendation algorithms, and endless scrolling". The bill proposes all covered online platforms to conduct "Child Safety Risk Assessments". The bill also covers application stores and operating systems, and demands the digital platforms to: establish a local office in the country and appoint a "compliance officer" for complaints involving content not appropriate for children.

==== Related discourse ====
Senator Panfilo Lacson proposed the mandatory use of the Philippine national identity card or "a backup ID" to verify the ages of social media users. He asserted any discretionary exception only creates "loopholes that could be used to circumvent the implementation of this law". On September 17, 2026, the Philippine House of Representatives exhorted Mark Zuckerberg of Meta Platforms to face the Department of Information and Communications Technology (DICT). DICT outlined "two non-negotiable demands" for Meta to continue their social media presence in the country: an actual local office in the country and mandating identity verification using the national identity card. Representative Brian Poe Llamanzares cited the effectiveness of mandatory online identity verification laws in Brazil and other countries.

Both Discord and Reddit vowed to establish their respective local offices in the country and to strengthen their measures on child safety, according to the Philippine Cybercrime Investigation and Coordinating Center (CICC). This included "green lanes" or direct communication channels that would allow the authorities to track down content deemed harmful to the children. CICC earlier warned that both platforms would be restricted if they failed to establish local presence that would "enhance coordination and cooperation with Philippine authorities", and if they failed to submit satisfactory strategies on "enhanced safety standards, rapid-response mechanisms, and age-verification or age-assurance measures".

Former DICT undersecretary and spokesperson of Child Rights Network Jeffrey Ian Dy, in a November 4, 2026 interview with Karmina Constantino of ABS-CBN News Channel, cautioned about the broad definition of the social media in the proposed laws, which he summarized as "everything that has a social interaction and is made public". He asserted that Discord, the comment sections of news websites, and Wikipedia might technically fall under the age verification mandates as these are "digital services with social functions".

=== South Korea ===
In 2011, South Korea enacted the Shutdown law. This law prohibited children under 16 from playing video games between 0:00 and 6:00, it originally only applied to computer games, but later expanded to cover console games and mobile games as well. The law received massive criticism and backlash from the general public, as well as calls for the abolition of the Ministry of Gender Equality and Family. It was repealed in August 2021.

South Korea has introduced seven bills related to social media age verification, including prohibiting the use of social media for children under 14, requiring parental consent for users under 16, and banning information-based algorithms for users under 19. Kim Jong Cheol, President of the Korea Media and Communications Commission, has stated that he supports placing age restrictions on social media platforms. However, South Korea is more considering softer and graduated restrictions than a ban on social media accounts under a certain age due to the country's failure with the aforementioned shutdown law, which prohibited minors under 16 from playing video games between midnight (00:00) and 06:00, causing certain games such as Minecraft to receive a 19+ rating and forcing Microsoft to amend their Xbox Live policy in the country to require one to be aged 19 or older and the verification of their government ID in order to create an account.

=== Tajikistan ===
In October 2025, lawmaker and member of parliament Dilnoza Ahmadzoda proposed a law to ban children under 14 from accessing social media and require written parental consent for children ranging from ages 14 to 17. She noted that recent amendments to the Law on the Protection of Children's Rights, which focused on cracking down on harmful content, were insufficient, and that a ban was necessary.

=== Thailand ===
Thailand has considered a social media ban similar to that in Australia, but no such proposals have been introduced in parliament, and none have set a specific age limit.

=== United Arab Emirates ===
On 18 June 2026, the UAE announced that it will outlaw the creation of social media accounts for children under 15. The provision of "regulated and safe access" to online platforms for those between the ages of 15 and 16 will be compulsory. Online platforms are also required to have "accurate and reliable age verification technology mechanisms". This prohibition is expected to take effect by mid-2027. Any online platforms that fail to comply within 12 months will face heavy daily fines, throttling, or blocking in the country.

=== Vietnam ===
In July 2026, a "consultation workshop" hosted by the Ministry of Culture, Sports and Tourism was held to gather feedback on draft legislation regarding social media and online gaming accounts for children under 16. The draft legislation requires those accounts to be verified through authenticated phone numbers or personal identification numbers and requires parents or guardians of those children to register and manage these accounts. This draft legislation also considers modifying gaming time limits, as well as age-classification criteria, in addition to amending required health warning standards. As of August 2026, the draft legislation does not specify when the proposed law would take effect.

== Europe ==
=== European Union (social media ban) ===
On 26 November 2025, the EU Parliament voted on a non-legislative report by a vote of 483–92–86. The report would set a minimum age of 16 for social media, while allowing those aged 13 to 15 with parental consent. The report also bans things such as infinite scrolling and auto-play, and would protect minors from commercial exploitation. It would also prohibit access to services that do not comply with the law within the EU.

On 13 July 2026, European Commission President Ursula von der Leyen officially pledged a bloc-wide push to limit children's access to social media, in which individuals under 13 will be restricted from using it, saying: "It is clear we need age-appropriate restrictions to platforms". A panel led by German psychiatrist Jörg Fregert and French epidemiologist Maria Melchor called for a delay of these restrictions to "social media plus", which refers to other online platforms using similar features, such as video games or AI chatbots. Two investigations against TikTok and Meta, the parent company of Facebook and Instagram, highlighted several problematic features such as video autoplay, endless scrolling, and aggressive push notifications.

On 13 September 2026, the EU Kids Act was introduced to the EU Parliament. The proposed regulation would outlaw the ownership of a personal account on video-sharing services, social media, online games, and AI chatbots for those under 13; accounts for these individuals are able to be created by their parents or guardians, who have full control over these accounts. For those aged 13 to 15, the creation of "introductory" accounts for those aforementioned services are possible. However, these accounts are subject to contact limits with strangers. Screen time and parental controls also apply to these "introductory" accounts. From those aged 15 onwards, children are able to start their own accounts. The regulation would also require age verification technology on video-sharing and social media platforms, in order to verify the ages of users. The EU Kids Act is to be enforced in a similar fashion to the Digital Services Act and the Artificial Intelligence Act, where companies were to pay supervisory fees.

=== Austria ===
In March 2026, Vice Chancellor of Austria Andreas Babler said that the country was considering a social media ban for users under 14 years of age, saying that the ban would help prevent children from developing a social media addiction. The proposed ban will be drafted by the end of June 2026 and will include "technically modern methods" of age verification to prevent children under 14 from using social media platforms covered by the ban. Unlike other countries in the EU that have set an effective date for their social media ban, such as January 2027 for Greece, there does not appear to be a set effective date yet for Austria's proposal.

=== Belgium ===
In April 2026, the Flemish Government announced that it was considering a social media ban for users under 13 years of age. Some communities in Belgium have proposed an even higher minimum age of 15 or 16. Age verification will likely be done through a centralized age verification tool such as Itsme or MyGov.be. However, this proposal has been controversial, since the ban is not a competence issue for the federal or regional government but one for communities, meaning that the ban would likely only apply to Dutch speaking communities and not French speaking ones.

Internet safety groups in Belgium, such as Belgian Safer Internet Centre and Child Focus, have stated that a social media ban is not likely to be very effective since the minimum age of 13 within the GDPR is already largely ignored. Therefore, increasing the age to 15 or 16 for social media use is not likely to be effective and that a better solution would be to increase media literacy and giving more tools and better resources to parents to protect their children and to make the internet safer.

=== Bosnia and Herzegovina ===
In December 2025, the President of the Party of Democratic Progress and the Mayor of Banja Luka, Draško Stanivuković, submitted the Resolution on the protection of children in the digital environment and the responsible use of social networks to the National Assembly of Republika Srpska. Stanivuković stated that the key message of the resolution is to limit the use of social media for children up to the age of 15.

=== Bulgaria ===
In May 2026, the political party GERB proposed a ban on social media platforms such as Facebook, TikTok, and Instagram for individuals under 16. An age-verifying mechanism would be utilized to confirm a newly registered user's age in order to access platforms included in the ban, whilst preserving their anonymity. For those aged 13 to 15, parental or guardian consent is required for permission to access these platforms. Lawmakers behind the proposed ban argue that it is necessary due to perceived evidence of negative effects on the attention spans, sleep patterns, mental health, and overall development of children, which originate from social networking services. This proposed law is an amendment to the Child Protection Act, and this law shall also apply to video sharing platforms.

GERB has also considered banning the usage of mobile phones in schools completely, arguing that they played a part in classroom distraction, decreasing concentration levels and effected academic performance negatively. Supporters of the ban have also said that phone usage compromises the ability of students to keep their motivation, effectively learn, and focus.

=== Cyprus ===
In April 2026, the European Commission launched an age verification application to restrict access to social media for underage persons in five European countries, with Cyprus being one of them. President Nikos Christodoulides announced that the minimum age for social media in the country will be 15, further stating that the proposal will be integrated into the national digital wallet application "Digital Citizen" within the same year.

=== Denmark ===
On 7 October 2025, the Prime Minister of Denmark, Mette Frederiksen, announced that the government was looking into banning social media for minors under 15, but has stated that it will likely include an exemption for those aged 13 or 14 with parental consent. The government plans to implement this policy as early as 2026. On 7 November 2025, Denmark's government announced an agreement to ban access to social media for anyone under 15 years of age, one of the strongest steps by a European Union government. How the ban would be enforced was not shared, but it may rely on Denmark's national electronic ID system.

=== Finland ===
In January 2026, the prime minister of Finland, Petteri Orpo, stated that he supported action to ban social media access for children under 15, saying it prevents young people from getting enough exercise. However, as of August 2026, no legislation has been introduced to restrict social media access for children.

=== Germany ===
Germany's upper house called for a ban on social media use for children under 14 and restrictions for those under 16, with the Chancellor of Germany, Friedrich Merz, supporting the proposal. A social media ban in Germany could face legal challenges as Germany's constitution gives parents the right to take care of the upbringing of their children.

=== Greece ===
On 8 April 2026, the government announced a ban on children under 15 years old from accessing social media, effective in January 2027. The Greek Prime Minister, Kyriakos Mitsotakis, said that the ban was intended to address social media's "addictive design", as well as increasing anxiety and sleep problems among young Greeks. A bill for the proposed ban was tabled before committees in the Hellenic Parliament on 13 October 2026 and was scheduled to be voted on by 22 October. It was approved on October 23 and the ban will take effect on 1 January 2027.

=== Netherlands ===
In 2026, the new Dutch Government (which is made up of the D66, VVD and CDA parties) considered a social media ban for minors under 15 years of age within the country. However, the proposal is still vague, as all the government has said is that the ban would be enforced through privacy-friendly age verification and would remain in place as long as social media is insufficiently secure, without defining what exactly these mean.

The former Dutch Government has opposed a social media ban stating that would be ineffective and would instead release guidance that social interaction platforms such as Instagram or TikTok should be avoided before 15 and that only messaging platforms such as WhatsApp or Signal should be used if they are over 13.

=== Norway ===
In late 2024, the Norwegian government announced it would set a minimum age of 15 for social media and require age verification to access social networks. In June 2025, the government would introduce the bill to set the age limit for consultation, with the deadline for this consultation being on 7 October 2025.

=== Poland ===
In February 2026, the Minister of Education, Barbara Nowacka, presented plans to ban social media use for children under 15, as well as to forbid the use of mobile phones in primary schools, which is currently up to individual schools. Companies that do not comply can face fines up to 6 percent of their annual revenue. Officials say that the social media ban is necessary to protect minors from online harm, which includes excessive screen time, cyberbullying, and disinformation. As of July 2026, there is no confirmed date on when this ban would take effect. However, in May 2026, Deputy Prime Minister and Minister for Digital Affairs, Krzysztof Gawkowski, said the government was still discussing it, with further related announcements arriving "in the coming weeks".

=== Portugal ===
On 12 February 2026, the Assembly of the Republic, the legislative body of Portugal, approved a bill by a vote of 148-69 that would prohibit children under 13 from having social media accounts and require parental consent for those aged between 13 and 15 years old. Parental consent would be verified through a system known as the Digital Mobile Key (DMK), and the proposed bill would fine noncompliant platforms up to 2 percent of their global revenue. The bill still needs a final vote to pass and become law.

=== Romania ===
In October 2025, the Romanian Senate proposed the Online Age of Majority law, which requires parental consent for individuals under 15 or 16 to access social media and other internet platforms. On 22 February and in June 2026, proposals were made to ban social media for those under 15, due to a study conducted by the Save the Children foundation that revealed that many Romanian children spend more than six hours daily on social media and create their first social media account at the age of five. If adopted, social media platforms may no longer rely on just the user's date of birth, instead relying on "effective methods" to verify if an individual is under 15 or not. For those aged 15 to 18, access to social media will not be barred; however, it will be subject to more restrictions and "protective measures" than those over 18. Monica Berescu, one of the lawmakers who proposed this ban, said that "Those between 15 and 18 will have access, but it will be access that protects them".

=== Russia ===
On 21 October 2025, Yevgeny Masharov, a member of the Civic Chamber, proposed an age verification plan that involved utilizing an individual's banking information, passport data, or driver's license in order for them to access online content meant for those 18 and over. This proposed law echoed similar laws enacted in Western countries such as the United Kingdom and the United States.

=== Slovenia ===
In February 2026, Matej Arčon said that the Slovenian Minister of Education was preparing a draft legislation to ban social media for children under 15 in the country, which would include platforms such as TikTok, Snapchat, and Instagram.

=== Spain ===
In February 2026, Spain announced plans to ban access to social media platforms for users under the age of 16. The announcement was made by Prime Minister Pedro Sánchez, who stated that the government intends to require social media companies to implement mandatory age-verification systems. According to Sánchez, the proposed measure aims to protect children and adolescents from potential harms in the digital environment, which he described as a "digital wild west." The policy forms part of broader efforts to strengthen online safety regulations for minors and increase platform accountability.

=== Sweden ===
On 2 June 2026, a government commission suggested the introduction of a minimum age limit for the use of social media at 15. Researcher Lisa Englund Krafft said that "The reasons for introducing age restrictions still outweigh the benefits of continued free access to this type of media," further stating that a ban for children under 15 can be devised in a way that the responsibility of age verification would lie directly in the platforms' hands, as stated in a joint press conference with Health and Social Affairs Minister, Jakob Forssmed, who stated that social media and their effects on children's health are "one of the biggest challenges of our time". Currently, the country has an age limit of 13, in which children are able to create social media accounts if and only if they have parental consent.

== North America ==
=== United States ===
Since 2022, multiple members of Congress have introduced bills that would either require age verification for social media platforms such as YouTube, Facebook, or Instagram, or heavily lean towards it even if it does not require it outright.

==== Kids Online Safety Act ====
The Kids Online Safety Act, also known as KOSA, is a bill in the United States Congress that requires online platforms, not just social media companies, that are likely to be used by children to reduce addiction and online harms to them through a duty of care. However, the bill has been criticized by the general public, as well as multiple civil rights groups such as the ACLU and EFF, for potentially leading to online censorship on services using age verification.

==== Kids Off Social Media Act ====
The Kids Off Social Media Act is a bill that was introduced originally in April 2024, but died before advancing. It was later reintroduced in January 2025 and advanced out of committee in February 2025; as of June 2025, the bill has been placed on the general calendar, meaning it can be taken up for a vote at any time. The bill bans anyone under 13 from having a social media account and bans certain algorithmic recommendations for anyone under 17; those opposed to it, such as the ACLU and Centers for Democracy and Technology, have warned that the bill could lead social media platforms into doing age verification via government ID to avoid liability.

==== Protecting Kids on Social Media Act ====
In April 2023, the Protecting Kids on Social Media Act was introduced, and it, like the Kids Off Social Media Act, bans social media services for children under 13, and also bans algorithmic recommendations; but instead of banning it for those under 17, it bans it for all minors under 18 and requires parental consent to use social media if the person creating the account is 13–17 years old. The bill was opposed by the Electronic Frontier Foundation because the age verification part of the bill would invade privacy rights and would make it easier for the government to identify people and because the parental consent provision could be problematic for older minors; the bill has since died and has not been reintroduced.

==== Kids Internet and Digital Safety Act ====
In March 2026, the Kids Internet and Digital Safety Act, also known as the KIDS Act, was introduced. It includes parts of legislation such as the Kids Online Safety Act, the SCREEN Act, SAFE BOTS Act, COPPA 2.0, the SPY Kids Act, and more. Notably, it removed provisions from the Kids Online Safety Act that required a duty of care system, but would still require large-scale age verification across social platforms.

The bill passed the House of Representatives on June 29, 2026, with 267 in support and 117 against. Though it is meant to ensure child safety on social networking websites, advocates such as the Electronic Frontier Foundation argue that systems' reliance on government-issued identification or biometric age estimation could chill anonymous speech by discouraging users from sharing sensitive information online.

==== State level ====
Online age verification laws by U.S. state as of November 2026.

=== Canada ===
==== Bill C-34 ====
On June 10, 2026, Canada's Culture Minister Marc Miller introduced Bill C-34, also known as the Safe Social Media Act, in the House of Commons. This would require social media companies to prohibit children under 16 years of age from having an account. However, social media platforms can be exempt if they maintain safeguards for children on their platform. The bill exempts video games and AI chatbots from the account ban for children under 16, though AI chatbots are regulated elsewhere in the bill. The bill does need to be approved by parliament first before taking effect.

==== Nova Scotia ====
Iain Rankin, former premier of Nova Scotia, said that his party, the Nova Scotia Liberal Party, is planning on introducing a bill to ban anyone under 16 from social media.

==== Quebec ====
In May 2025, a committee of Quebec Legislative members recommended that social media be banned for those under 14 without parental consent, though it is unclear if they plan on introducing legislation to implement this policy.

=== Costa Rica ===
On 9 December 2025, a bill known as File 25536 was introduced in the Legislative Assembly of Costa Rica. The bill would ban social media accounts for users under 14, allow children to use only services designed for children, require age verification to create accounts, and require parental consent for users who are between 14 and 17 years of age. The age verification would be through Costa Rica's minor card, which is known as a TIM. The bill would later be advanced out of committee on 14 April 2026 unanimously to be debated and voted on. However, as of 16 May no vote has been taken.

=== Trinidad and Tobago ===
In January 2026, the Prime Minister of Trinidad and Tobago, Kamla Persad-Bissessar, said the government would ban social media use for children under 12 years of age. However, she has not made clear how it will determine the age of users or when it will take effect.

== South America ==
=== Ecuador ===
In March 2026, Katherine Pacheco Machuca, a member of Ecuador's National Assembly, introduced a bill that would ban social media use for children under 15 years old, with penalties for noncompliance of up to 5 percent of their local annual revenue, and would take effect 18 months after being published in the official registry of Ecuador. The bill is meant to combat growing crime within the country and was introduced after a report from Ecuador's Organized Crime Observatory found that 27% of youth who had been recruited into organized crime had been through social media. Ecuador is also considering other measures to address the growing organized crime in the country beyond the social media ban.

== Oceania ==
=== Fiji ===
The Fiji Minister for Information, Lynda Tabuya, and the Fiji Minister for Communication, Ioane Naivalurua, have launched a task force to study the effects of international laws on social media age restrictions and to possibly propose prohibiting those under 16 from social media within the country. However, they have stated that such a bill would not be introduced to the Parliament of Fiji without public consultation first.

=== Papua New Guinea ===
In October 2025, the government of Papua New Guinea approved its 2025 social media policy, which included a plan to require users in Papua New Guinea to verify their age to prove they are 14 years old or older to access social media platforms such as TikTok or Instagram. The age verification will be done via the use of a "SevisPass" digital ID. Platforms must also set up locations in the country and be closely monitored for supposed harmful content. The government claims that the reason for this policy is to curtail online abuse, fake news and scams. However, it has been criticized for potentially limiting free speech.

=== New Zealand ===
In inspiration of Australia's Online Safety Amendment, the National Party of New Zealand, along with the Prime Minister of New Zealand, Christopher Luxon, introduced the Social Media (Age-Restricted Users) Bill in May 2025, which, just like its Australian counterpart, bans social media accounts for children under 16, with the maximum fine that can be imposed being 2 million NZD. This bill has been placed on a pause following consideration of wide regulation change.

On 24 August 2026, Christopher Luxon announced that social media use for children under 16 would be banned. Alongside this, the Online Safety (Minimum Age and Child Safety Risk Assessment) Bill was introduced to the House of Representatives the same day. This bill, like the Australian social media ban, requires social media services such as YouTube and Facebook to take reasonable steps to check that users are over the age of 16. Non-compliance penalties would total up to 10% of a company's global revenue. However, it has faced opposition from ACT and New Zealand First.

== Countries that have rejected online age verification laws ==
=== Asia ===
==== Hong Kong ====
In July 2026, the Secretary for Innovation, Technology and Industry, Dong Sun, announced that the government currently does not have any plans to forbid the usage of social media by underaged individuals via law, stating that any action implemented to restrict access to the internet or content online would need to consider multiple aspects, which include the impact of said content and access on the social and psychological development of young persons, the local ecosystem of innovation and technology, and public expectations regarding information's free flow, and that any unconditional restriction or ban would also need to take into account the feasibility of enforcing it. He further said that even when online safety laws regarding children are in effect, the implementation of said laws remains difficult due to factors such as cross-border jurisdiction and age verification, and that matters such as this require deep public discussion and a general accord before the drafting of specific restrictions.

=== Europe ===
==== Croatia ====
In March 2026, the parliamentary club We Can! requested that access to social networks be restricted for those under the age of 15. According to their proposal, access to social media would be allowed to those under the age of 15 only with the consent of a parent or guardian, although their access would still be restricted between 10 p.m. and 8 a.m. The Minister of Justice, Public Administration and Digital Transformation, Damir Habijan, rejected the proposal, saying that the issue of the technical implementation of such a ban has not yet been resolved.

==== France ====
On 29 June 2023, France passed a law which would require parental consent for anyone under 15 to use social media; however, the bill passed without a clear effective date, stating that they would apply it as soon as possible. If the bill does go into effect, then companies would be fined up to one percent of their revenue if they do not comply with the law. Since this law has passed, the President of France, Emmanuel Macron, has said he could look into a complete ban for anyone under 15 to use social media.

In September 2025, during the policy development, some lawmakers discussed implementing "digital negligence," which would fine parents if they fail to supervise their children online, making France the second country to propose criminalising access to social media for children after the failure of a similar proposal in Pakistan.

In January 2026, the National Assembly of France approved a government-backed bill banning the use of social media by children under the age of 15. The legislation, supported by President Macron's administration, was adopted by 116 votes to 23 and aims to "protect minors' mental health by mitigating risks such as online harassment and psychological harm". The law requires social media platforms to implement age-verification mechanisms, while allowing exemptions for educational resources such as online encyclopedias. This proposed legislation was championed by President Macron and was passed by the Senate.

In July 2026, the French Parliament approved the law, and the ban would have taken effect in two stages, with the first stage requiring age verification for creating new accounts and taking effect in September 2026, whilst the second stage would have applied age verification to existing social media accounts and would have taken effect in January 2027.

On 14 August 2026, this law was struck down by the Constitutional Council because it "constitutes a restriction that is not appropriate, necessary or proportionate".

==== Estonia ====
The Estonian Justice and Digital Affairs Minister, Liisa Pakosta, supports the idea of finding ways to decrease the harmful effects of social media for young people. However, she does not support the idea of implementing age verification, saying that it could affect everyone and could easily be bypassed by young people; instead, she supports enforcing existing EU Laws and better education for young people and parents.

==== Italy ====
The Italian Prime Minister, Giorgia Meloni, has said that her government would not introduce a social media ban for children, specifically for those under the age of 16, saying that such bans "can be easily circumvented", further stating a social media ban may risk "to transfer the problem on families" and can be ineffective unless governments pressure social media platforms to intervene and "take their responsibilities".

== Reception ==
=== Support ===
A survey conducted by the Pew Research Center between May 26 and June 1, 2026 showed 78% of US adults favored mandating users of all ages to verify their ages before using social media. It increased from 71% in 2023. Support was highest among 50- to 64-year-old US adults, and lowest among 18- to 29-year-old US adults, at 84% and 66%, respectively. Among US adults, 83% of the parents of a child under 18 support age verification measures, compared to 76% of US adults with no children aged under 18. An opinion poll conducted among adults in the United Kingdom by YouGov in 2025 found that 39% strongly support, 35% somewhat support and 19% oppose banning social media use for children under the age of 16. In a poll conducted by Léger, 83% of Canadians showed concern about social media’s potentially negative impact, while 81% were concerned about AI chatbots such as Claude, ChatGPT, and Copilot. Regarding a ban on social media, 32% of Canadians said that social media should be banned for children under 16, while 29% said that social media should be banned for those under 17. Only 5% said that social media should not be age-restricted. Seven out of ten, or 70% of people in Canada, supported a ban on social media for those under 16, which included 44% who strongly support a ban of this type. Banning AI chatbots garnered a similar level of support, with 69% of Canadians supporting a ban, which included 41% who strongly support such a ban.

Politicians on the Crown Dependency of Jersey in the United Kingdom have expressed concern for the safety of children after a review revealed that there was no age verification on adult sites in the Crown Dependency. The review, conducted by the Children, Education and Home Affairs Scrutiny Panel, found that claims that regulations in the UK would protect children indirectly were not entirely certain, meaning that children on the island “may now face fewer barriers to accessing inappropriate content than their UK counterparts”. Deputy Catherine Curtis stated that evidence in the review demonstrated that children at a young age will acquire usage of said inappropriate content due to their curiosity, further stating that one in ten children would have accessed pornographic sites for adults by the time they reach the age of nine.

The Philippine Council for the Welfare of Children asserted that it is crucial to implement age verification checks to restrict minors from social media platforms, since they must be shielded from harmful online content "during a stage where children are still developing judgment and resilience". They added that it is a "shared responsibility" to protect them while they navigate the digital space. A supportive editorial by the Philippine newspaper Manila Standard asserted the age verification proposals "shift responsibility away from overwhelmed parents and toward the corporations that profit from children's engagement" and "restore authority to parents and guardians who have long been outpaced by the speed and opacity of tech platforms". It claimed the self-regulation approach being practised by social media platforms has "repeatedly failed to protect minors".

Philippine cybersecurity watchdog Scam Watch Pilipinas urged the formation of an "ASEAN Big Tech Accountability Framework" as a "united front" for the ASEAN region that would compel the Big Tech to enforce accountability by "addressing harmful content and scams and strengthening protection for children and vulnerable users". The coalition's lead convenor Jocel de Guzman cited the European Union's success in compelling the online platforms to comply with regional laws through both the Digital Services Act and the Digital Markets Act. He claimed that if the platforms wanted access to "nearly 700 million ASEAN consumers", the regional bloc "must also have the power to demand accountability from them".

=== Criticism and concerns ===
The online age verification laws and proposals have received criticism and severe backlash from the general public, as well as organisations that focus on digital and civil rights (such as the Electronic Frontier Foundation, American Civil Liberties Union and Freedom House in the United States) for normalising mass surveillance and restricting freedom of speech through the elimination of anonymous accounts. The New Zealand Council for Civil Liberties, UNICEF, and the Council of Europe Commissioner for Human Rights have also opposed such laws on the basis that they constitute violations of the rights to freedom of speech and privacy, that such laws may backfire, and that there are better ways of protecting children online.

These laws can also be bypassed by loopholes with technologies such as VPNs, which have seen a significant number of new users in countries where these laws are enforced. Despite the laws being mainly used to verify the ages of users on social media services, critics believe that these laws, which verify users' ages with invasive methods (such as facial scans, handing over government IDs and presenting credit cards), would be silently expanded beyond social media to include apps, games, website and devices to create a realm of digital censorship.

In March 2026, Ross Scott, the founder of consumer movement Stop Killing Games affirmed the movement's support for the opposition of age verification laws in a statement on X. In a lengthened statement posted on Reddit, Stop Killing Games criticised laws such as California's Digital Age Assurance Act and the UK's Online Safety Act 2023. The movement referenced Urban Dead, a web game that was forced to shut down on 14 March 2025 after the game's creator, Kevan Davis, found the implementation of required measures in the Online Safety Act as "unfeasible".

In May 2026, Wikipedia founder Jimmy Wales called an Australia-inspired online age verification law "an unmitigated disaster and an embarrassment". He further added that compelling adults to submit "personally identifying information" just to prove their ages "is really unsafe". Instead of online age verification laws, he suggested the governments should educate the adults on the existence of the parental controls on their children's phones. The developer of the Firefox browser, Mozilla, suggested "holding online platforms accountable, encouraging the responsible use of parental controls, and investing in digital skills and a whole-society approach to digital wellbeing" instead of age verification.

A study conducted by the University of Newcastle in June 2026 found that 85% of Australian children ranging between 12 and 17 years old were still using social media despite legislation barring them from doing so. More than half of these children utilize their own accounts. The study made the conclusion that a ban on social media would perhaps be more effective when applied to children under the age of eight instead of adolescents who already utilize it.

James Baker, the free expression manager at the Open Rights Group, a digital rights group based in the UK, stated that disadvantages to age checks include the privacy of individuals, as well as the risk of transferred data being breached, saying: “One of the downsides we have seen is in terms of people’s privacy. If they hand that data over to a company, then the data can be at risk of being breached”.

Ann Cuisia, CEO of Philippine fintech organization TraXion Tech, asserted that banning minors from social media "may reduce exposure" but they could "find ways around it". She also said that stricter measures mean "platforms start collecting more personal information". She suggested a "layered approach" instead, which included "platform redesign, smarter regulation, parental guidance, and digital literacy". Former Philippine Senator Manny Villar opined about the concerns on privacy and data security, the ability of some children to bypass restrictions using fake identities, and a "widening inequality" for families whose only resources of information and creativity are online. Philippine IT organisation Computer Professionals' Union (CPU) also criticised the proposed online age and identity verification measures and instead suggested the following alternate measures: "accessible mental health services, comprehensive digital literacy programs integrated into educational systems, and stricter gun controls".

== See also ==
- Online age verification laws in the United States
- The Anxious Generation - A book that popularised many age verification laws including Australia's social media ban
- Parental controls
- Internet censorship and surveillance by country
- Internet censorship
- Censorship
- Internet
- Age verification
- Computer and network surveillance
