= Live service game =

Video games with continuing revenue model

In the video game industry, a live service game (also referred to as games as a service, abbreviated to GaaS) represents providing video games or game content on a continuing revenue model, similar to software as a service. Live service games are ways to monetize video games either after their initial sale, or to support a free-to-play model. Games released under the live service model are designed to receive a long or indefinite stream of monetized new content over time to encourage players to continue paying to support the game. This often leads to games that work under a live service model to be called "living games" or "live games" since they continually change with these updates.

== History and forms ==
The idea of games as a service began with the introduction of massively multiplayer online games (MMOs) like RuneScape and World of Warcraft, where the game's subscription model approach assured continued revenues to the developer and publisher to create new content. Over time, new forms of offering continued GaaS revenues have come about. A significant impact on the use of GaaS was the expansion of mobile gaming, which often includes a social element, such as playing or competing with friends, and with players wanting to buy into GaaS to continue to play with friends.

Chinese publisher Tencent was one of the first companies to jump onto this around 2007 and 2008, establishing several different ways to monetize their products as a service to Chinese players, who typically play on a phone or at internet cafés rather than on consoles or computers, and since has become the world's largest video game publisher in terms of revenue. Another influential game establishing games as a service was Team Fortress 2. To fight against a shrinking player-base, Valve released the first of several free updates in 2008, the "Gold Rush Update" which featured new weapon that could be unlocked through in-game achievements. Further updates added more weapons, along with new cosmetic additions to the playable characters in the "Sniper vs. Spy" update of May 21, 2009, initially starting as items players could only randomly obtain before the "Mann-Conomy" Update of September 30, 2010, which began to include monetization options, such as buying virtual keys to open in-game loot boxes. Valve began earning enough from these revenues to transition Team Fortress 2 to a free-to-play title. Valve carried this principle over to Counter-Strike: Global Offensive and to Dota 2, the latter of which was in competition with League of Legends by Riot Games. To remain competitive, League of Legends, which already had a microtransaction model in place, began adding new game content regularly, such as a new playable character every few weeks for several years straight. This contributed to the creation of the concept of lifestyle games such as Destiny and Tom Clancy's The Division.

Some examples include:

Game subscriptions
Many massively multiplayer online games (MMOs) use monthly subscription models. Revenue from these subscriptions pay for the computer servers used to run the game, the people that manage and oversee the game on a daily basis, and the introduction of new content into the game. Several MMOs offer an initial trial period that allow players to try the game for a limited amount of time, or until their character reaches an experience level cap, after which they are required to pay to continue to play.
Game subscription services
Subscription services like EA Play and Xbox Game Pass grant subscribers complete access to a large library of games offered digitally with no limitations. Users need to download these games to their local computer or console to play. However, users must remain subscribed to play these games; the games are protected by digital rights management that requires an active account to play. New games are typically added to the service, and in some cases, games may leave the service, after which subscribers will be unable to play that title. Such services may offer the ability to purchase these titles to own and allow them to play outside of the subscription service.
Cloud gaming / gaming on demand
Services like PlayStation Plus, or GameFly allow players to play games that are run on remote servers on local devices, eliminating the need for specialized console hardware or powerful personal computers, outside of the necessary bandwidth for Internet connectivity. These otherwise operate similar to game services, in that the library of available titles may be added to or removed from over time, depending on the service.
Microtransactions
Microtransactions represent low-cost purchases, compared to the cost of a full game or a large expansion pack, that provide some form of additional content to the purchaser. The type of content can vary from additional downloadable content; new maps and levels for multiplayer games; new items, weapons, vehicles, clothing, or other gear for the player's character; power-ups and temporary buffs; in-game currency, and elements like loot boxes that provide a random assortment of items and rewards. Players do not necessarily need to purchase these items with real-world funds to acquire them. However, a game that aims to provide ongoing service will gear its design and financial approach to assure that a small fraction of players will purchase this content immediately rather than grinding through the game for a long time to obtain it. These select "whales" providing sufficient revenue to support further development of new content. This approach is generally how free-to-play games like Puzzle & Dragons, Candy Crush Saga, and League of Legends support their ongoing development, as well as being used atop full-priced games like Grand Theft Auto Online and NBA 2K.
Season passes
Games with season passes provide one or more large content updates over the course of about a year, or a "season" in these terms. Players must buy into a season pass to access this new content; the game remains playable if players do not purchase the season pass and do gain benefit of core improvements to the game, but they are unable to access new maps, weapons, quests, game modes, or other gameplay elements without this content. Games like Destiny, its sequel and Anno 1800 use this season pass approach. A related concept is the battle pass which provides new customization options that a player can earn by completing challenges in a game, but only if they have bought into the battle pass; content on a battle pass is typically only obtainable during a limited time. Battle passes can be seen in games such as Dota 2, Rocket League, Tom Clancy's Rainbow Six Siege and Fortnite Battle Royale.
Blockchain game
Games which use technology based on blockchain strategies, which can include cryptocurrency and non-fungible tokens (NFTs). In contrast to microtransactions in which players can buy but not usually capable of trading items with other players, blockchain games encourage players to create value with blockchain items and trade and sell these, with the developer or publisher taking a small fee on each transaction. As blockchain items assure a singular owner, this can lead to high-selling items due to speculative buyers. As of 2021, blockchain games have yet to catch on due to the stigmas associated with cryptocurrency and NFTs. Some notable blockchain games include CryptoKitties and Axie Infinity.

Games may combine one or more of these forms. A common example are lifestyle games, which provide rotating daily content, which frequently reward the player with in-game currency to buy new equipment (otherwise purchasable with real-world funds), and extended by updates to the overall game. Examples of such lifestyle games include Destiny, Destiny 2 and many MMORPGs like World of Warcraft.

== Rationale ==
The principal reason that many developers and publishers have adopted GaaS is financial, giving them the ability to capture more revenue from the market than with a single release title (otherwise known as "games as a product"). While not all players will be willing to spend additional money to gain new content, there can be enough demand from a smaller population of players to support the service model. For example, for World of Warcraft, it was estimated on the basis of average revenue per user (ARPU), that only 5% of the game's population paid 20 times more than the baseline ARPU, sufficient to continue ongoing development of the game. GaaS further represents a means by which games can improve their reputation to critics and players by continued improvements over time, using revenues earned from GaaS monetization to support the continued development and to draw in new sales for the product. Titles like Diablo III and Tom Clancy's Rainbow Six Siege are examples of games offering GaaS which initially launched with lukewarm reception but have been improved with continued service improvements.

Games as a service also impacts the development process for games. When developing a game as a product, there is generally a linear flow of tasks to assure that the product shipped is free of software bugs and other problems that may exist, which can be both time-consuming and costly to test for. If there are critical bugs found post-release, this can also be costly to develop, test and distribute software updates to rectify. In developing games as a service, where consumer expectation is already set to expect continual updates to the game, the rigor on software testing in the early stages of release may be forgone as to get the title out to players faster, accepting that software bugs may be present but will be fixed when the next update is released. Further, games developed as a service are more commonly driven by player feedback, so initial iterations of a game's release may be lightweight to be used as a foundation to build upon based on the game's community. This can further shorten the initial development cycle of a game. However, games as a service also increased overall development effort as there are usually two or more concurrent tracks to support a game; one working to support the current available release, and others that are working on the future content that will be added to the game.

While the games as a service model is aimed to extend revenues, the model also aimed to eliminate legal issues related to software licenses, specifically the concept of software ownership versus license. Case law for video games remains unclear whether retail and physical game products qualify as goods or services. If treated as goods, the purchaser gains several rights, in particular those related to the first-sale doctrine, which allows them to resell or trade these games, and which can subsequently affect sales revenue to publishers. The industry has generally considered that physical games are a service, enforced through end-user license agreements (EULAs) to try to limit post-sale activities, but these have generally not been enforceable since they affect consumers' rights, leading to confusion in the area. Instead, by transitioning to games as a service, where there is a clear service being offered, publishers and developers can clearly establish their works as services rather than goods. This further gives publishers more control over the use of the software and what actions users can do through an enforceable EULA, such as preventing class action lawsuits.

GaaS can reduce unauthorized copying. Certain games can also be hosted in a cloud server, eliminating the need for installation in players' computers and consoles.

== Impact ==
In 2017, industry analysis firm Digital River estimated that by 2016, 25% of the revenue of games on personal computers resulted from one form or another of GaaS. The firm argued that this reflected on consumers that wanted more out of games that were otherwise offered at full price (US$60 at the time of the report) or looking for discounts, thus making the market ripe for post-release monetization. Several major publishers, including Square Enix, Ubisoft and Electronic Arts identified GaaS as a significant focus of their product lines in 2017, while others like Activision Blizzard and Take-Two Interactive recognized the importance of post-release support of a game to their financial bottom lines. GaaS is also seen as a developing avenue for indie video games, which frequently have a wider potential install base (across computer, consoles, and mobile devices) that they can draw service revenues from.

A study by DFC Intelligence in 2018 found Electronic Arts' value rose from US$4 billion to $33 billion since 2012, while Activision Blizzard saw its value rise from $20 billion to $60 billion in the same period, with both increases attributed in part to the use of the GaaS model in their games catalog. Electronic Arts had earned $2 billion from GaaS transactions in 2018. The COVID-19 pandemic, which forced much of the world to stay at home to prevent its spread, was a further boom to the video game industry overall, including a major push for live service games, expanding their staff and capabilities to match. This led to an over saturation of the market by 2020.

Developing for live service games can change the culture of video game development, since rather than developing towards a single release and moving on to the next game, developers have to plan for continued content beyond release as well as ongoing support for the game. Due to this cost, live service games ultimately are shuttered by their developers and publishers for various reasons, such as waning player interest, shifting costs on the business, or moving away from aging technology. However, in the 2020s, the question of the sustainability of live service games was raised as many live-service games were terminated well ahead of anticipated lifecycles. An early example of such a game was Anthem, released in 2019, which failed to meet sales expectations, and while long-term plans were made to improve the game, its development was ultimately cancelled by 2021. Epic Games, the developers behind Fortnite, announced large cuts of around 900 and 1,000 in 2023 and 2026, respectively, the latter layoffs partially a result of waning engagement with Fortnite. These cuts also led to discontinuation of some of the game modes within Fortnite with Epic seeking to improve the remaining experiences for players. Commentators saw this as a signal that live service games may not be as sustainable as once thought.

As more games switched towards live services, competition for players grew, making the prospect of live service games a risky one. A notable example was Concord, a multiplayer game developed by Firewalk Studios and released by Sony Interactive in August 2024, but which was shuttered after two weeks due to low sales in a crowded market, followed by Sony shutting down Firewalk Studios and cancelling further development of the game shortly thereafter. Similarly, hero shooter Highguard was developed by Wildlight which was made up of several former Respawn Entertainment developers that had worked on Apex Legends, with the game developed to try to capture some of the facets that had made Apex a success. It was released in January 2026 after a major promotion from The Game Awards, had high interest at launch but in two weeks had lost of its playbase over criticisms of the gameplay complexity and difficulty in working with teammates without voice communication, and the bulk of the developers at Wildlight had been let go, with the game shut down in March 2026. Existing live service games can also be impacted by new competitors, with Bungie announcing it would end live service updates for Destiny 2 in June 2026, though will keep the game playable indefinitely.

Stella Chung, writing for IGN and using MultiVersus, published by Warner Bros. Games, as an example, criticized the lack of access when live service games go offline, especially for those who invest money in it. She also pointed out the oversaturation of the market with free-to-play live service games, and that many live service games struggle, leading to them shutting down. On January 31, 2025, it was announced that MultiVersus would be delisted and its online servers closed permanently on March 30, 2025, after the end of the fifth and final season, remaining playable in offline modes. Players who had purchased the game's founders pack, costing $100 and which granted them in-game currency and vouchers for some characters, said that they would be unable to use these since many of the characters released for the game were released freely, and believed they were scammed by Warner Bros. Games.

Following Ubisoft's announcement that they were closing the servers for The Crew in April 2024, rendering the game fully unplayable, a player-driven initiative, Stop Killing Games was launched by Ross Scott, creator of Freeman's Mind, to try to encourage governments to promote regulations that would require live service games to remain playable in offline modes after online servers are closed. While one petition from this initiative reached the UK government by February 2025, the government opted to not take steps to modify laws for such cases but saying that game publishers were still bound by other consumer protection laws.

== See also ==
- as a service
