= Stop Killing Games =

Video game preservation consumer movement

- The movement's logo, a broken gamepad symbolizing the destruction of video games
- Abbreviation: SKG
- Formation: April 2, 2024
- Founder: Ross Scott
- Type: Consumer movement
- Purpose: Video game preservation after online shutdowns
- Methods: Petitioning; Advocating for legislation; Cataloging "dead" games; Backing lawsuits
- Official language: 32 languages
- Website: www.stopkillinggames.com

Stop Killing Games (SKG), also known as Stop Destroying Videogames (SDVG), is a consumer movement that seeks to preserve video games after they are taken offline. It was started in 2024 by Ross Scott in response to the shutdown of Ubisoft's The Crew, a 2014 racing game that required a constant internet connection despite being mainly single-player. It uses various legal avenues to push for requiring video game publishers to keep games playable and in a reasonably functioning state even after their discontinuation, challenging the industry trend of selling games as a revocable license or service that can at any moment be rendered obsolete by the publisher.

Stop Killing Games quickly garnered popularity, being covered by various YouTubers and news outlets. It was praised by various celebrities, politicians and game developers for tackling a long-lasting problem in the video game industry, though some were sceptical, citing issues with licensed and proprietary content as well as increased development costs due to preservation efforts.

Stop Killing Games has launched multiple government petitions, of which the most prominent is a European Citizens' Initiative named Stop Destroying Videogames, which received around 1.3 million valid signatures. Additionally, a UK Parliament petition managed to amass enough votes for an official debate, though it was ultimately decided that no amendments to existing law would be made.

== Background ==
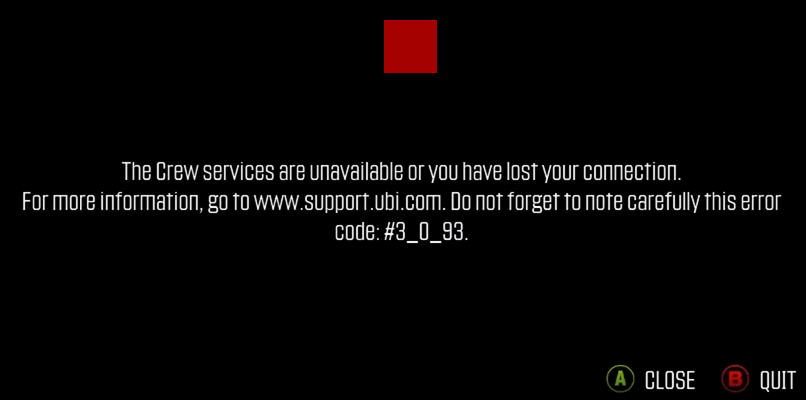
Error message seen upon launching The Crew after March 31, 2024

The Crew was a 2014 racing game developed by Ubisoft Ivory Tower and Ubisoft Reflections and published by Ubisoft. The game was designed to require a constant internet connection to Ubisoft's online servers to play, including for play in single-player. By December 14, 2023, Ubisoft delisted the game and its expansions from digital platforms, suspended sales of microtransactions, and announced that the game's servers would be shut down on March 31, 2024, citing "upcoming server infrastructure and licensing constraints". Ubisoft offered refunds to people who "recently" purchased The Crew, though the time window for an eligible refund was not specified. The servers were shut down as planned on the announced date. Days after the shutdown in early April 2024, Ubisoft began revoking licenses from players who had bought The Crew.

Ross Scott explaining Stop Killing Games in a 2025 interview

Ross Scott is a YouTuber primarily known for his machinima series Freeman's Mind and the owner of YouTube channel Accursed Farms. He has been critical of the shutdown of online-only games, describing the practice as an "assault on both consumer rights and preservation of media" and comparing it to movie studios during the silent film era "burning their own films after they were done showing them to recover the silver content", while also pointing out that "most films of that era are gone forever." In 2019, Scott criticized games as a service, calling it fraud.

== Overview ==
The main goal of Stop Killing Games is to prevent video game publishers from unilaterally rendering purchased games unplayable, typically by shutting down servers for online-only games. The majority of online-only games become inaccessible after discontinuation, with fewer titles receiving official offline patches despite public outcry. Fan-made patches to keep games playable after their shutdown require a dedicated community and run the risk of receiving a takedown notice from the publishers due to alleged copyright or trademark infringement. A problem since the 2000s, it has been exacerbated over time by the increasing prevalence of digital rights management systems and the decline of private server options.

A central concern of Stop Killing Games involves online-only games and downloadable content being listed on storefronts prominently as a purchase instead of as a rent or lease, despite the possibility of access being remotely denied to the purchaser (without an expiration date at the time of purchase) by the publisher for any or no reason. This practice is widespread across the gaming industry and untested in courts. Historically, video games have frequently been dismissed as children's toys and associated with geek culture from their inception until approximately the mid-2000s. Consequently, politicians have largely overlooked issues related to video game preservation and have marginalized video games as a legitimate art form. Stop Killing Games seeks to convince lawmakers of the artistic value of video games and their importance as a product, emphasizing the necessity of preservation efforts and addressing concerns regarding the apparent lack of user ownership and potential consumer law violations by publishers.

Stop Killing Games does not demand for games to be supported and updated by their developers forever, rather arguing that they should be required to be left in a reasonably functional state after discontinuation, such as by introducing an offline mode or the ability to host private servers. Scott also clarified that the movement does not focus on the delisting of games from storefronts as long as they are still playable by buyers after discontinuation, and that they do not focus on any financial censorship issues.

Stop Killing Games uses government initiatives and other legal avenues in order to pursue regulation in favor of game preservation. Countries with strong consumer protection laws, such as France and Germany, are prioritized within the movement's reach. Other countries are less available, such as Brazil, due to lack of The Crew's sales data, or the United States, which Scott wrote off as a fruitful legal or political arena for any initiative as a result of the precedent set by the court ruling ProCD, Inc. v. Zeidenberg.

=== Members ===
Ross Scott is the founder of the movement, spearheading it until his standby break in August 2025. Moritz Katzner is a German political operative involved with SKG since 2025, being the strategy lead behind the European Citizens' Initiative and the two official non-governmental organisations launched in February 2026, as well as one of the organizers of the movement alongside Daniel Ondruška. Jonah Goldman is the director of operations performed in United States. The European Citizen Initiative was spearheaded by a number of volunteers from across Europe.

== Activities ==
=== 2024 ===
External videos
- The largest campaign ever to stop publishers destroying games

In April 2024, after the shutdown of The Crew, Scott released a video titled "The largest campaign ever to stop publishers destroying games" on his YouTube channel introducing Stop Killing Games and launched a website for the campaign. He also encouraged multiple petitions for Stop Killing Games, such as the UK Parliament petition and the European Citizens' Initiative (ECI) in the European Union, the latter of which gained over 350,000 signatures in the first two months.

At the same time, public complaints about The Crew's shutdown to consumer agencies were also encouraged, such as the Directorate General for Competition, Consumer Affairs and Fraud Protection in France and the Australian Competition and Consumer Commission in Australia. The European Citizens' Initiative was later renamed to Stop Destroying Videogames, with Scott opting not to use the word "kill" to avoid confusion with the topic of violence and video games. The initiative's organisers have been reported to cooperate with members of the European Parliament, Niklas Nienaß from the Green Party and Patrick Breyer from the Pirate Party.

The UK government responded to the Parliament petition, stating that "there is no requirement in UK law compelling software companies and providers to support older versions of their operating systems, software or connected products". On May 30, 2024, the petition was cut short due to the calling of the 2024 general election in the country. A new petition was started, quickly gaining over 10,000 signatures, which was the amount needed for a guaranteed response for the government.

=== 2025 ===
Online game playability chart, as tracked by SKG (as of May 23, 2025):
1. Preserved by developers 16 (2.40%)
2. Preserved by fans 110 (16.5%)
3. At risk 313 (46.9%)
4. Unplayable 229 (34.3%)

In February 2025, the UK government responded to the new petition, stating that it had "no plans to amend consumer law on digital obsolescence", but pointing out that "if consumers are led to believe that a game will remain playable indefinitely for certain systems, despite the end of physical support, the CPR may require that the game remains technically feasible ... to play under those circumstances". In May 2025, Scott published a spreadsheet containing various online-only video games and their playability status. Rock Paper Shotgun reported that 68% out of the 738 games were either unplayable or at risk. Only 16 games that were playable after discontinuation have been salvaged by the developers, with the other 110 being fan-preserved.

While the European Citizens Initiative gained many signatures at the start, it quickly lost momentum, stagnating at around 450,000 signatures, 45% of the 1 million signatures needed for Commission representatives to act on the petition. In June 2025, Scott uploaded a video, expecting the initiative to fail and outlining that the problem with the insufficient signatures "isn't getting gamers to care about games; it's getting people to care about anything". Support for the initiative increased greatly after the release of the video.

On July 2, 2025, the UK Parliament petition reached 100,000 signatures, meaning it was considered for debate in Parliament. One day later, the European Citizens' Initiative (ECI) reached 1 million signatures, making it eligible for debate in the European Commission. However, Scott stated that more signatures were still needed to offset invalid ones. The UK petition went on to close on July 14, 2025 with 189,887 signatures. For the ECI, an additional target of 1.4 million signatures was set, which was achieved on July 20, 2025. Scott also stated that a cryptocurrency under the title of Stop Killing Games had nothing to do with him or the campaign, calling it a "scam".

On July 21, 2025, Scott said that a transparency complaint had been filed against the EU petition, accusing the campaign of failing to "provide clear, accurate and comprehensive information on the sources of funding for the initiative exceeding €500 per sponsor". Scott rejected the claim, noting having no financial support on the EU petition and claiming that the organisers "literally asked EU representatives if it was okay for [him] to assist them in the capacity [he] have been back in spring 2024... [and] they said what [he has] been doing is fine". He also stated that the EU petition is separate from the Stop Killing Games campaign and has its own organisers, of whom he is not a part of. While the complaint was filed anonymously, Scott suspected video game industry representatives to be behind it.

On July 29, 2025, Scott encouraged his YouTube viewers to send feedback to the EU's Digital Fairness Act public consultation. On July 31, 2025, the Stop Destroying Videogames European Citizens Initiative closed, with a final signature count of approx. 1,448,271 signatures. Initial validation by the initiative estimated that 97% of the signatures were valid, making it likely the petition would require addressing by the EU. On August 4, Scott opined that Stop Killing Games has "changed the timeline, or is attempting to" and that "without [Stop Killing Games], The Crew would have been just another shutdown", noting the lack of response from various previously discontinued games, most notably Overwatch. He also stated that he hasn't "had time to play a game for close to a couple months", aiming to go on a "standby break" from the campaign. On October 26, Stop Killing Games organiser Moritz Katzner shared the progress of the ECI validation and the Digital Fairness Act, the latter of which was described as "record-breaking", and revealed their intention of cooperating with other game studios, clarifying that "the vast majority of studios—especially European ones, both indie and AAA—have always listened to players and strived to do right by the community" and that the issue of game preservation "is driven by a powerful few who do not represent the values of creators or players."

=== 2026 ===
Shortly after the shutdown of the 2019 game Anthem on January 12, 2026, the official Twitter account for Stop Killing Games stated that the customer "should have the final say as to when [one's] done with a game, not the company", addressing the game's poor reputation with the proverb "one man's trash is another man's treasure." On January 26, 2026, the SKG team revealed a final count of 1,294,188 valid signatures—89% of the initial signature count—for the verification phase of the European Citizens' Initiative. Following the announcement, the European Commission stated that it has until July 27, 2026, to discuss the initiative in detail, initiate a public hearing and present an official reply "outlining the actions it intends to take, if any".

On February 19, Scott revealed that two official Stop Killing Games non-governmental organisations (NGO) were launched in the EU and the US, stating that the NGOs will allow for "long-term counter lobbying" as well as websites for reporting delisted games to consumer protection agencies. The EU efforts are led by Moritz Katzner. Scott also opined that the video game industry spends more money on lobbyists than it would take to "fix their development process".

External videos
- SKG Press Conference (Brussels, February 2026)

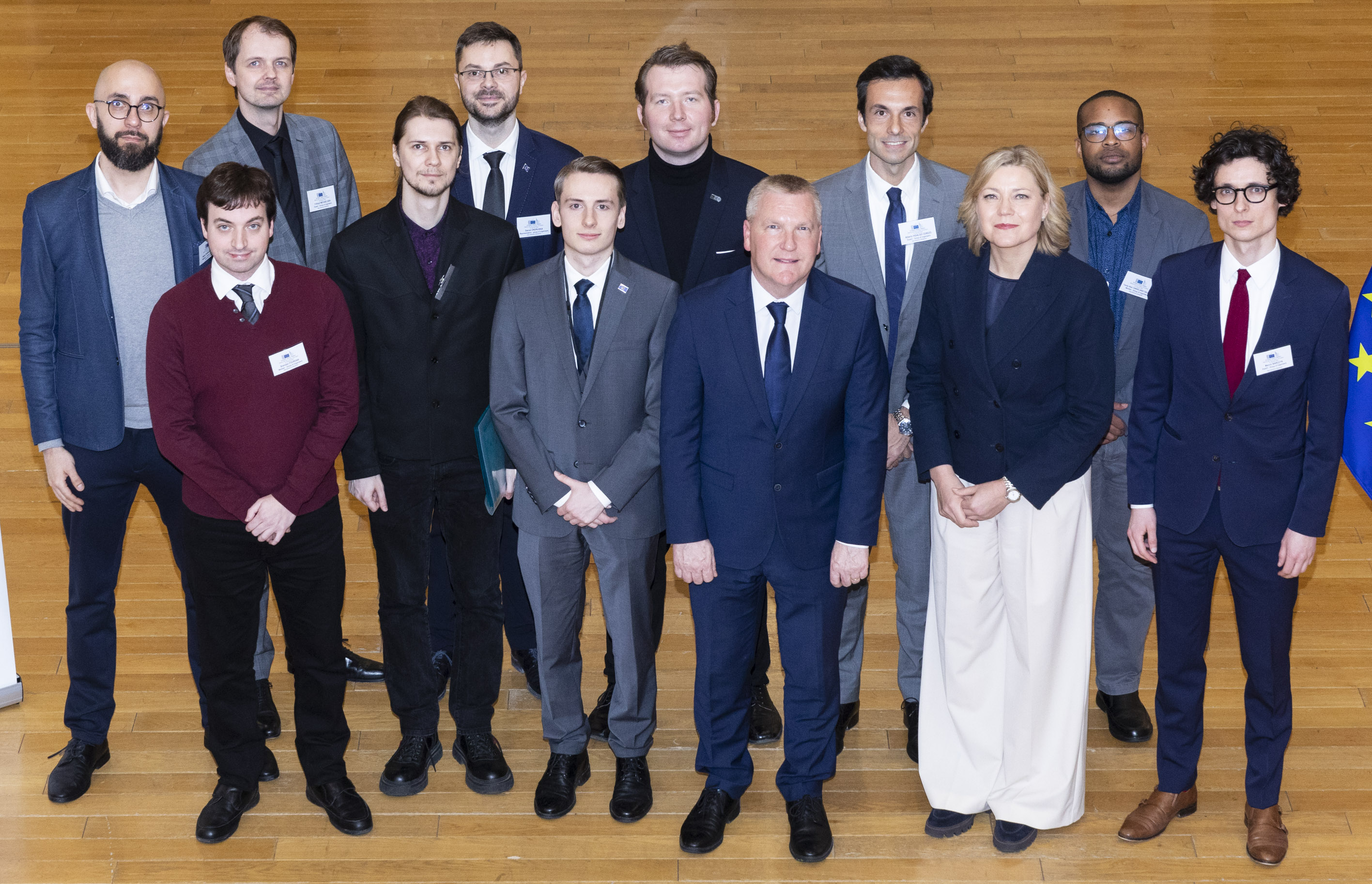
Stop Destroying Videogames organisers alongside Henna Virkkunen and Michael McGrath during the European Commission visit

On February 23, a press conference between Stop Killing Games and members of the EU Parliament was held in Brussels. Markéta Gregorová, MEP for Greens–European Free Alliance, emphasized the impact of campaigning, mentioning the Chat Control proposal that was widely criticized as invasive and inefficient by various groups and individuals, despite initially receiving support in the Parliament. She said that the upcoming Digital Fairness Act was presented to the European Commission, with the Parliament now being able to make amendments to the legislation. Despite saying that the Commission had "factually no interest to bring [SKG] in", Katzner remarked that the meeting went fine and helped highlight bipartisanship from both left- and right-wing political parties. YouTuber Josh "Strife" Hayes, who was present during the press conference, noted the difficulty of presenting video games to lawmakers as "products [that] are being removed via a one-sided contract that gives companies permission to do so whenever". The same day, the organisers of Stop Destroying Videogames presented the initiative's signatures to the Commission.

On March 31, 2026, with the support of Stop Killing Games, the French consumer rights group UFC-Que Choisir sued Ubisoft over the shutdown of The Crew, asserting Ubisoft misled consumers on the permanence of availability for the game. In April 2026, Stop Killing Games unveiled its support for the drafting of the California bill Protect Our Games Act. On May 5th Mortiz Katzner announced that announced that Gamer's Voice a UK Ltd Company will serve as the UK NGO vehicle for Stop Killing Games. Gamer’s Voice is run by James Baker, and Tom Shannon and launched with the support of Tom Gordon MP. Later in May 2026, SKG gave its support for groups fighting against age verification laws. Scott said that such laws threaten video games since they "can also make private servers, modding communities, fan projects, open-source tools, and preservation work harder or even impossible to operate". Scott used the example of Urban Dead, a 20 year old browser game ran from UK servers that was forced to shutdown due to being unable to meet requirements set by the UK's Online Safety Act 2023.

In June 2026, Stop Killing Games helped to launch a sister campaign called 'Stop Killing the Internet. This was in response to restrictions to internet access and age verification laws. Commenting on the launch Mortiz Katzner said “We are building a global movement, if you believe in building a better internet and fighting for a global connected Internet then join us". The sister campaign brings gamers together with a broad group of digital rights organizations around the world to oppose restrictions on internet access.

In August 2026, Stop Killing Games joined a Dutch consumer rights organization Stichting Massaschade & Consument in a lawsuit against Sony. The lawsuit started after Sony's announcement of the cessation of the production of physical discs for the PlayStation 5, which the plaintiffs argue establishes a digital monopoly, stating "your PlayStation is designed so you can only buy digital games through Sony's own store. And once Sony stops selling physical games in 2028, you won't have any choice at all." Concerns were also expressed about the lack of a second-hand market and, consequently, competitive pricing.

In September 2026, Stop Killing Games came out against the EU Kids Act, a European Commission proposal that would restrict children's access to social media and impose age assurance and safety-by-design requirements on several online services, including online games. In a video published on September 29, Scott described the proposal as the biggest threat the campaign had faced and "the most draconian proposal I've ever seen regarding video games and consumers". Scott argued that the age verification requirements could be applied to individual online games, that compliance costs would fall hardest on smaller studios, and that the rules would make private servers for unsupported games effectively illegal. The UK Chapter of Stop Killing Games published a briefing document on how the EU Kids Act would impact video games and the Stop Killing Games campaign. A legal analysis by Pinsent Masons confirmed that online games were within scope of the proposal. The group urged supporters to contact MEPs to reject the proposal and to instead add its preservation goals to the Digital Fairness Act, and encouraged signing the "Stop Killing Internet" European Citizens' Initiative. German outlet Mein-MMO noted that this reading of the text was the group's own interpretation, and MLex reported that the proposal's binding rules do not expressly cover games.

== Reactions ==
=== Initial reception ===
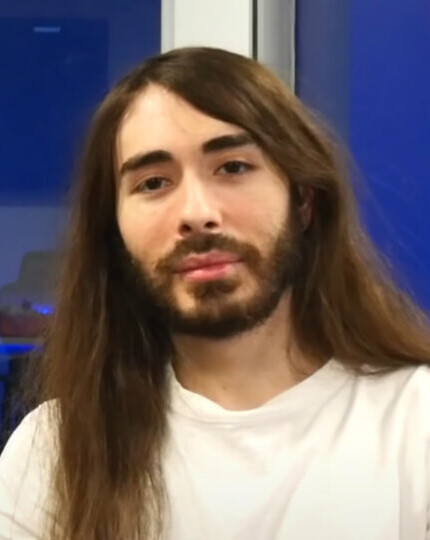
MoistCr1tikal, one of the first to praise the movement

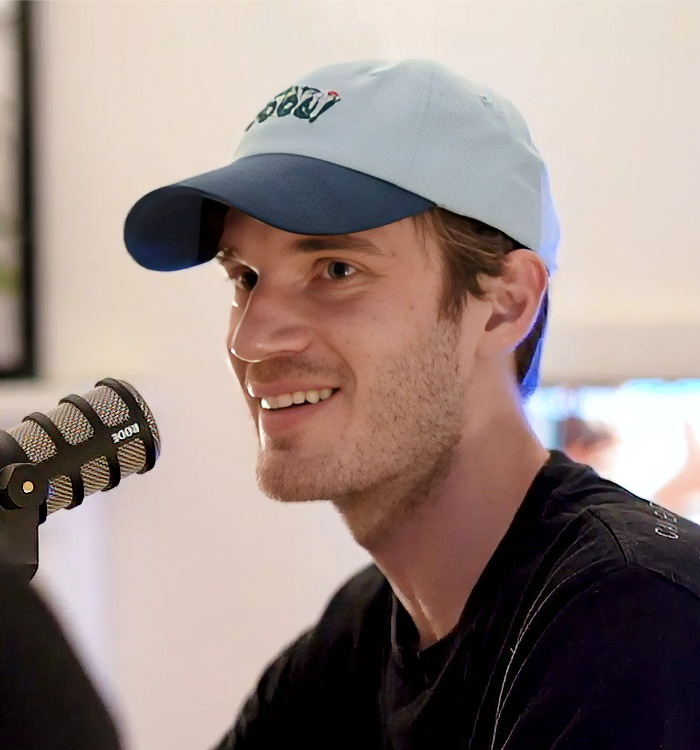
PewDiePie, one of the most-subscribed YouTube channels, encouraged the movement.

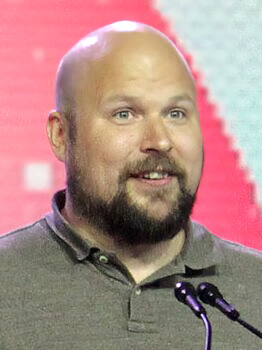
Markus Persson, the creator of Minecraft, also supported the initiative.

Upon the release of the Stop Killing Games introduction video in 2024, it quickly gained views and was covered by multiple gaming news outlets and YouTubers. Streamer Jason Hall, known online as PirateSoftware, criticized Stop Killing Games in a video on his YouTube channel; his response is thought by Scott to have stagnated the campaign's progress. On June 23, 2025, after Hall had repeatedly refused subsequent attempts at clarification from Scott, the latter publicly criticized Hall's video, stating that the former didn't understand the purpose of the campaign and that he had misconstrued the initiative.

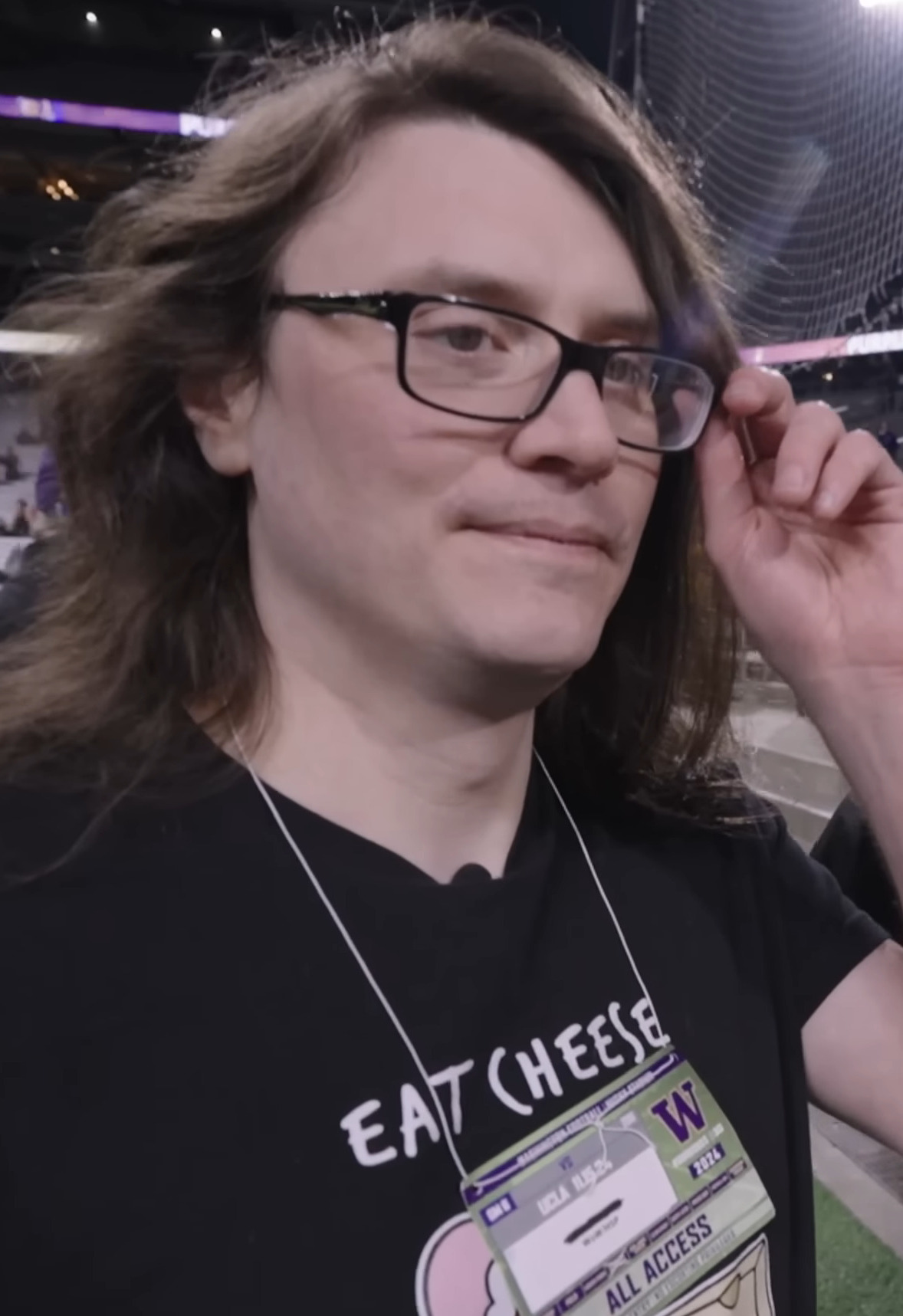
Jason Hall, known as PirateSoftware, was critical of the movement.

Several other YouTubers, such as MoistCr1tikal, came out in defense of Scott, sharing many of the same criticisms against Hall. In addition, gaming content creators such as xQc, Asmongold, PewDiePie and jacksepticeye, as well as consumer rights activist Louis Rossmann, have also shown support for the initiative.

=== Political and organisational reaction ===
Member and Vice-President of the European Parliament Nicolae Ștefănuță endorsed and signed the European Citizens' Initiative. Markus Persson, the creator of Minecraft, also supported the initiative. Owlcat Games, the developer studio behind Pathfinder: Wrath of the Righteous and Warhammer 40,000: Rogue Trader, responded positively to the initiative, stating that "Every player deserves lasting access to what they've paid for." Alanah Pearce, a notable game journalist, interviewed 20 anonymous developers from various game studios, and although they questioned the perceived vagueness of the petition, all of them support the movement and opined that it may challenge current video game preservation efforts.

Sergio Ferrera, intellectual property lawyer and writer for Gamesindustry.biz, opined that, while the petition has good intentions, it "runs the risk of doing more damage than good" and that "for real change to happen, proposals must reflect the realities of IP law, contract obligations, and server infrastructure", noting the difficulty of converting a server-dependent game to work offline as well as potential legal issues with licensed content and proprietary middleware. Sam Leith of The Spectator was supportive of the initiative, framing it as a significant part of a wider fight against lack of property ownership, comparing the initiative to issues around the right to repair and cars with built-in features locked behind monthly subscriptions.

In an interview with TheGamer, Randy Pitchford, president and CEO of Gearbox Software, expressed his appreciation for the movement, noting to have experienced the shutdown of Battleborn and calling it an "emotional experience", while stating that he "[admires] the activism", opining that "it comes from the same heart that [he has], which is a heart that loves experiences that are worthy and just wants to make sure they're there forever." Mark Darrah, former BioWare employee and producer of the discontinued Anthem, stated that while he does "believe in game preservation" and that the game could have been built with preservation in mind, mentioning Destiny 2's peer-to-peer hosting system as an example, the game likely would "have been a worse experience" because of potential additional spendings on game preservation that could be spent elsewhere, opining that with SKG "there are consequences to basically mandating that things not go away forever, but maybe those are consequences that we want to pay, that we want to accept".

UFC-Que Choisir, a French consumers group, have stated that "regarding The Crew ... the information provided upstream, upon purchase and use of the game, is far too vague for an average consumer to be aware that they have simply acquired the right to play", and that they are considering to take the matter to court. Maciej Gołębiewski, managing director of GOG Sp. z.o.o., called game preservation a "very complicated riddle", noting the difficulties of ownership, technical aspects and commercial viability, while opining that putting "too many barriers on game creators and what the end-of-life cycle looks like" may result in fewer games being made. Dino Patti, co-founder of Playdead, expressed his dislike towards online digital obsolescence, noting himself buying The Crew and never having the chance to play it, while stating that it's a step in the right direction.

Former Call of Duty developer Robert Bowlling stated that his new studio will not work on live service projects, with the games featuring "optimized P2P architecture that allows the community to play together even if the company moves on," while also promising to open source any non-third party code and assets if the studio closes. Video Game History Foundation director Frank Cifaldi responded a user comment on Bluesky that stated "piracy is the only extant form of media preservation that exists in games right now," supporting the claim and noting that trade organizations "refuse[d] to offer a meaningful alternative." Flux Digital Policy expert Dr. Ceila Pontin stated that, while she "understand[s] people's passions behind [the movement]," the terms of service already establish the handling of live service games, noting that the consumer protection laws cited on the SKG website do not universally apply to all areas of regulation, such as digital products, and that "it takes more than conviction to overturn the many reasons IP holders are allowed to end access to a game you paid for, but they really own."

==== Trade associations ====
Video game industry trade association responses were mostly critical of the movement and its actions. In July 2025, Video Games Europe, a trade association representing game developers and publishers in the European Union, responded to the European Citizens' Initiative, stating that it would be "too expensive for developers and publishers to offer private servers or single-player modes in games that lose online multiplayer support" and that fan-supported games and servers "could present legal liabilities for companies".

The Entertainment Software Association (ESA) strongly opposed the introduction of the Protect Our Games Act in April 2026. In a statement to ABC10, ESA argued that the Californian bill "could force developers to spend limited time and resources keeping old systems running instead of creating new games, features, and technology", and that the policy does not reflect the current state of the gaming industry, where "many games depend on evolving technology, licensed content, and online systems that change over time." This prompted a response from Katzner, who argued that the bill is not retroactive, does not demand perpetual support and stated the bill "gives companies options: preserve ordinary use, patch the game, or refund the purchaser." PC Gamer noted that the ESA's stance was not unprecedented, citing a similar response from Video Games Europe as well as ESA's lobbying against a DMCA exception proposed by the Video Game History Foundation that would allow libraries and museums to remotely share access to digital copies of the out-of-print games.

==== Ubisoft ====
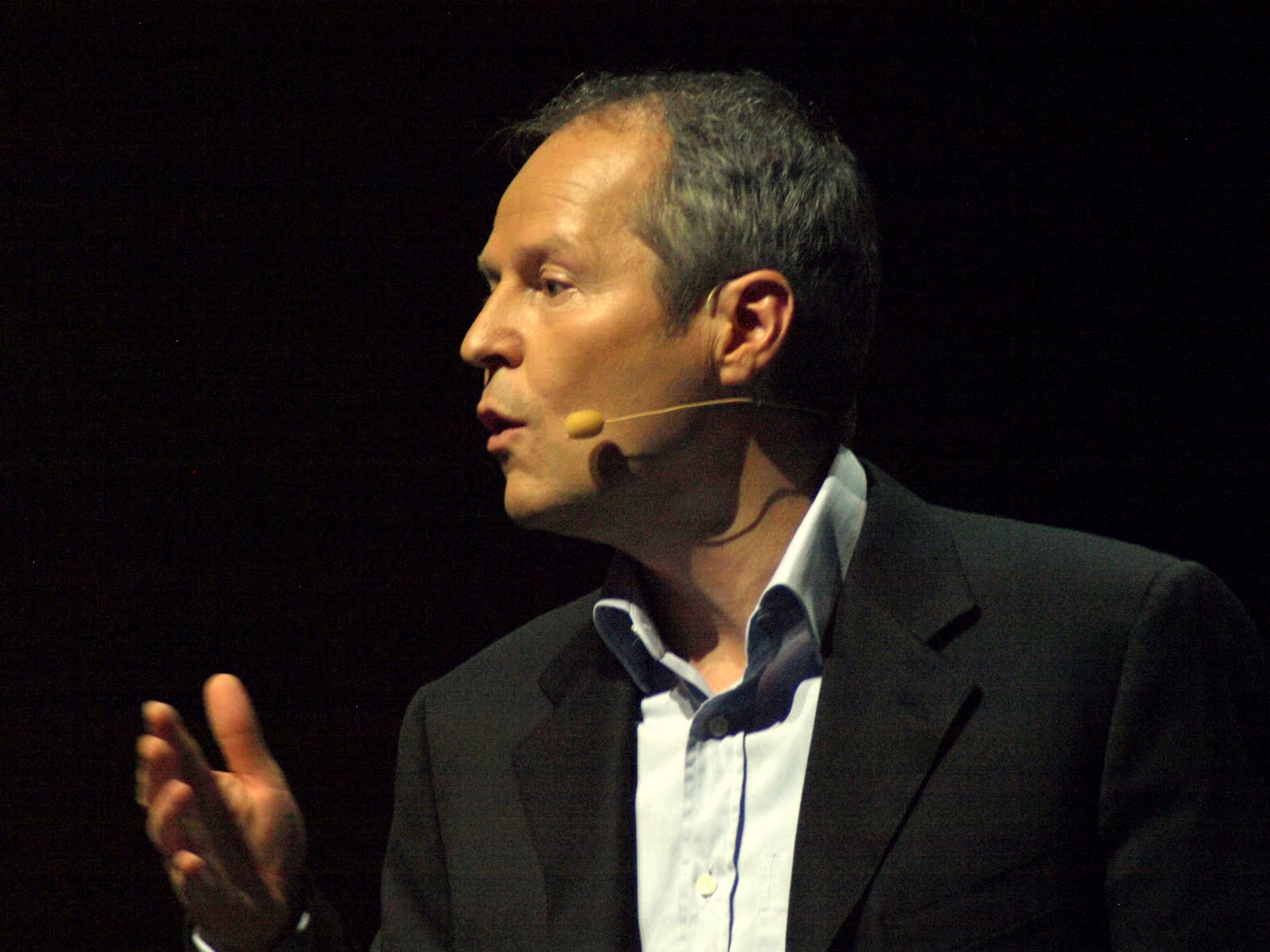
Yves Guillemot, the chairman and CEO of Ubisoft

Ubisoft initially refused to comment on the situation with The Crew. After severe player backlash—fueled in part by the initiative launched by Stop Killing Games, according to PC Gamer—Ubisoft promised to add an offline mode to The Crew 2 and The Crew Motorfest, though the discontinued The Crew was not mentioned. In April 2025, Ubisoft released an update video on the upcoming offline mode for The Crew 2, stating that not all features will be available offline and that the mode playtesting will begin on April 30. The offline mode was added to The Crew 2 in October 2025 and continued receiving improvements into 2026. Motorfest's offline mode is still planned. Scott opined that Ubisoft had no end of life plans prior to the movement.

In July 2025, CEO of Ubisoft Yves Guillemot responded to a shareholder's question about Stop Killing Games, stating that the company provides "information regarding the game and how long the game can be played" and that the company is "doing [their] best to make sure that things go well for all players and buyers", clarifying that "support for all games cannot last forever." The response was negatively received, with various users and news sources stating that the goal of Stop Killing Games is to ensure game playability after the end of support, rather than a demand for perpetual support.

== Debates ==
=== UK Parliament ===
External videos
- E-petition debate relating to consumer law and videogames - Monday 3 November 2025.

The UK Parliament petition debate took place November 3, 2025, being livestreamed on the official UK Parliament YouTube channel. Various points were raised by the members of Parliament. Pam Cox, Labour MP for Colchester, argued that the current consumer protection laws are insufficient and that video game publishers should "provide routes for players to retain or repair games" after the end of developer support. Henry Tufnell, the Labour MP for Mid and South Pembrokeshire, opined that taking down games "erases a cultural and artistic heritage that is vital to society and to the wider industry", noting that "if every copy of a book, film, or song were destroyed, we would see it as a cultural tragedy." Mark Sewards, Labour MP for Leeds South West and Morley, compared the discontinuation of games to a printer being remotely turned off after the end of support, stating that the publishers should provide a "reasonable" option of using the product after discontinuation via single-player modes or private servers.

The debate lasted about an hour, and it was ultimately decided that no amendments to law would be made, but that the government would work to ensure that companies would provide consumers with accurate information. Stephanie Peacock, the Parliamentary Under-Secretary of State for Sport, Media, Civil Society and Youth, stated:

The government is sympathetic to the concerns raised, but we do also recognise the challenges in delivering this from the video game industry perspective. First, this would have a negative technical impact on video game development. It is true that there are some games where it would be relatively simple to patch an offline mode after its initial release, but for games whose systems have been specifically designed for an online experience this wouldn't be possible without major redevelopment. Requiring an end of life plan for all games would fundamentally change how games are developed and distributed. While that may well be the desired outcome for some campaigners, it isn't right to say the solutions would either be simple or inexpensive.

— Stephanie Peacock

Though Katzner considered the verdict unsatisfactory, he stated that the UK efforts are "far from dead in the water." After the debate, Morton Atkins, chairperson and coordinator of Green Party of England and Wales's branch for Aylesbury Vale in Buckinghamshire, expressed his desire to pursue the party's MPs, which were not present at the debate due to their low numbers, to support Stop Killing Games.

=== European Parliament ===
European Parliament session hearing with Ross Scott about Stop Destroying Videogames

As the European Citizens' Initiative was successfully summited to the European Commission in February 2026, the public hearing at the European Parliament was held on April 16, 2026. Committee vice chair Nils Ušakovs highlighted the importance of the initiative, calling it a "concern for [...] probably hundreds of millions of European citizens." European Commission director and copyright lawyer Giuseppe Abbamonte pledged to look into copyright regulations that aren't adequately covering the video game industry and report his findings in July. Ross Scott was also invited as a speaker. He highlighted the lack of legal protections of customers who buy online-only games, emphasizing that unilaterally disabling products would be considered "outrageous in other industries", comparing terms of service in online-only games to an insurance policy that can be nullified by the seller at any time and for any or no reason without a money-back guarantee and calling such practices "scams":

Publishers know customers expect video games to last, so they sell these in the same ways as ones that can work forever, as a one-time purchase with no expiry date and price them the same. Were publishers to inform us when they planned to disable a game, it would of course reduce sales of that game, since the longevity of a game affects how much customers are willing to pay. The industry is trying to have it both ways, trying to find ways to say they're selling you a game that they're not selling you. This creates confusion for everyone involved and it's part of the reason why it's taking customers to get exposure on this practice.

— Ross Scott

Additionally, Scott shared statistics about video game shutdowns, noting that 93.5% out of 400 discontinued games were left in an unusable state. He concluded by welcoming solutions to the online game preservation problem, clarifying that the movement focuses on consumer protection and does not demand for business model changes so long as the publishers can provide sufficient end-of-life support.

European Parliament plenary session in the EU Hemicycle, Strasbourg

A plenary session between the EU Parliament and the European Commission was held on May 21, 2026, during which various topics proposed by the Conference of Presidents were discussed, including the Stop Destroying Videogames initiative. Polish MEP Piotr Müller supported the initiative, though expressed caution about potential overregulation of the market. Czech MEP Ondřej Krutílek stated that, while he understands the initiative's arguments, he "honors private enterprise, the free choice of providing goods and services, and the copyright of publishers", reiterating that buying a digital game only grants you a license. Far-right Slovak politician and Republic Movement leader Milan Uhrík supported the initiative, claiming that video games are being destroyed by "woke ideology and political correctness", citing Assassin's Creed Shadows protagonist Yasuke as an example. Uhrík is believed to have misunderstood the initiative, according to Kotaku and PC Gamer. Katzner stated that Uhrík was "supportive in tone, but in [his] view somewhat missed the point."

Approximately two weeks before the European Commission issued a response, Ubisoft CEO Yves Guillemot was reported to have attended an "invitation-only" meeting with the European Commission hosted by Video Games Europe. On June 16, 2026, the European Commission issued an official response to the petition. They stated that they "cannot propose a legal obligation to keep video games playable after they stop being provided commercially", citing intellectual property rights that game publishers retain even after the game is no longer playable and arguing that existing EU consumer laws offer enough protection. They instead committed to "engage with consumers and publishers by the end of 2026 to explore ways to improve industry standards", promoting an awareness campaign on consumer rights and working with publishers and consumer rights groups to craft a code of conduct around games entering their end of life, opining that "active enforcement of these existing consumer rights can also incentivise the providers to offer video games with longer lifespans and explore solutions for meeting consumer expectations." Scott, expecting such outcome and fearing that "all [they would] see is a non-binding communication and nothing changes", noted that new legislation can still pass due to the Digital Fairness Act receiving a majority support.

== Effects ==
=== United States ===
Assembly Bill No. 2426

Despite Scott being pessimistic about the movement's effectiveness in the United States, several law amendments were proposed, particularly in the state of California. Signed in September 2024, Californian law AB 2426 forces sellers of digital goods to specify what a consumer receives after making a transaction. Under the new law, sellers of digital goods must state that the purchaser is receiving a license next to the "buy" or "purchase" button. However, the law does not forbid the use of the words "buy" or "purchase". The law does not extend to games that can be played offline permanently. The law came into effect on January 1, 2025. Various sources attributed the law's signing to SKG's impact. In October 2024, Steam added a disclaimer that a game purchase only grants a license. GOG.com, a DRM-free storefront, responded to the law by posting a concept of a checkout banner on X which says that GOG's offline game installers "cannot be taken away".

==== California AB-1921 - Protect Our Games Act ====
In February 2026, the AB-1921, the Protect Our Games Act, was introduced in the California legislature. Initially proposed by California State Assembly member Chris Ward, the bill would require publishers to inform consumers 60 days in advance about a game ending support and to provide clear information about the game's functionality after its end-of-life, with exclusions for subscription-based or free-to-play games, and for games that can already be played offline. The bill would also prohibit companies from selling a game two months before their discontinuation and require them to provide either a patch for the game to function independently of the publisher's servers, a separate version of the game that operates autonomously in the same vein or a full product return. The bill would affect all games published in California released after January 1, 2027.

In June 2026, Ward stated that the bill, despite only being valid in California, could still affect the entire U.S. video game market due to the California effect, "because California is such a large market, companies often choose to adjust their practices nationwide rather than create state-specific systems." He also noted the difficulty of enforcing the law on game publishers, noting that larger companies engaging in deliberate systemic non-compliance could face harsher penalties.

A committee hearing was scheduled for April 16, 2026. Another hearing occurred on May 14, chaired by state assembly representative Buffy Wicks, during which the California State Assembly's Committee on Appropriations reviewed the bill, with 11 votes in favour, two votes against, and two abstained voters. The assembly passed the bill on May 29, 2026, on a 43-16 vote, and it was sent to the California Senate's Business, Professions and Economic Development committee to pass. Out of the 11 politicians, four voted for, three against and four abstained; this was not enough to secure the bill, being three votes away from a required supermajority.

=== Brazil ===
In July 2026, Brazilian federal deputy Jandira Feghali proposed a bill that aims to preserve online-only games, directly inspired by the Stop Killing Games movement, according to Push Square. The bill would require publishers to inform consumers about the reliance on online servers, state a minimum support period of at least two years and notify about the shutdown 180 days in advance. Additionally, upon the discontinuation of a game, publishers would be mandated to either release a patch for offline support, provide tools for hosting private servers or reimburse players based on their time spent within the game. Another federal deputy Erika Hilton requested an investigation into Sony Interactive Entertainment after their announcement to stop producing physical discs for the PlayStation 5 from January 2028, stating that the decision does not address countries with limited Internet access and could potentially violate Brazil's Consumer Protection Code.

== See also ==
- Live service game
- List of delisted video games
