= Plenary session =

Session of a conference with no absentees

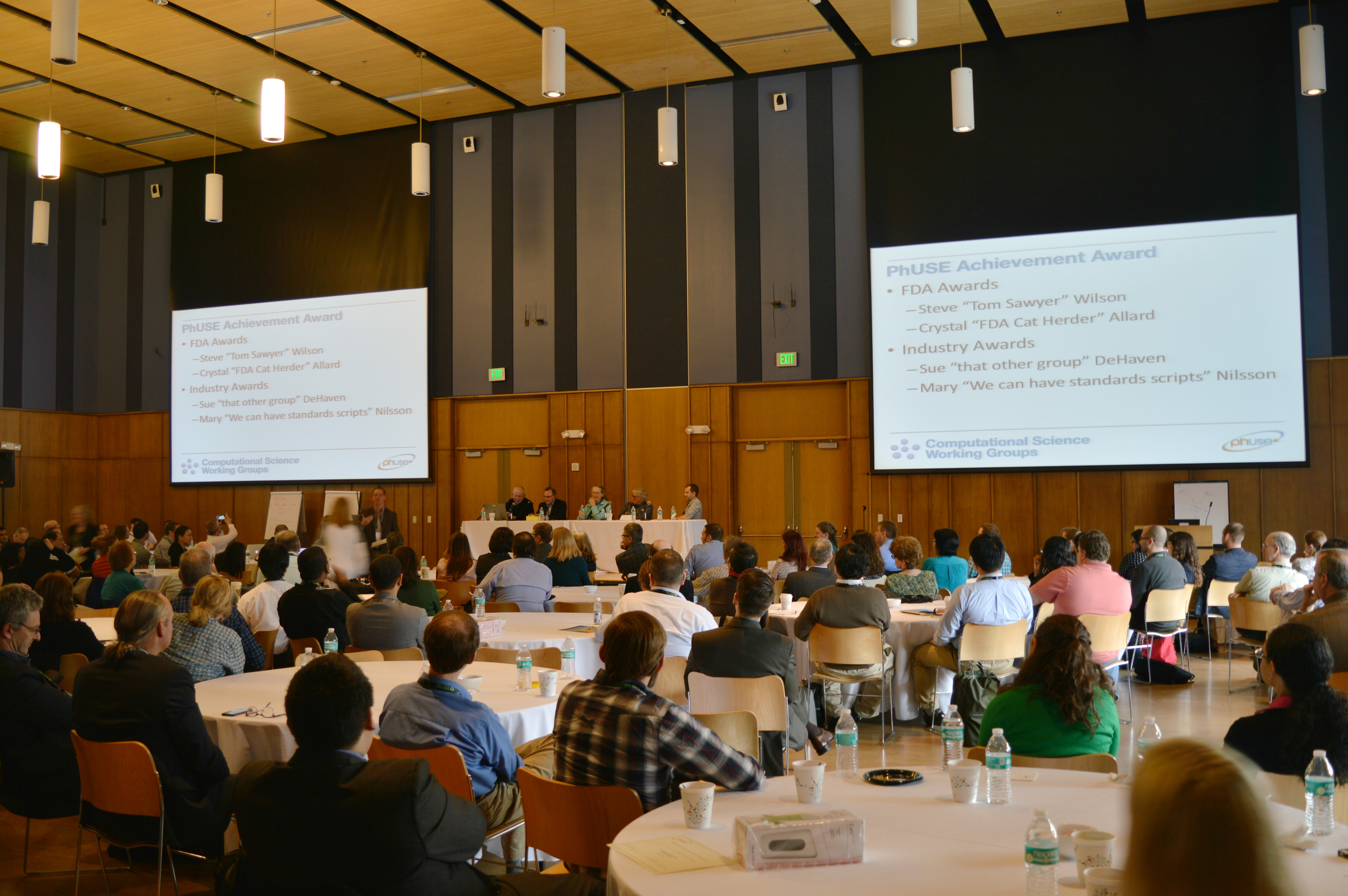
All members of a conference are expected to attend plenary sessions

A plenary session or plenum is a session of a conference or deliberative assembly in which all parties or members are present. Such a session may include a broad range of content, from keynotes to panel discussions, and is not necessarily related to a specific style of presentation or deliberation.

The term comes from the Latin word 'plenus' meaning 'gathered', and has come to be used in academic settings, such as conferences, just before, or after, breaking into smaller groups. This can be a time for summarising information, and may encourage class participation or networking.

European Parliament legislative plenary session discussing the Stop Destroying Videogames initiative

A plenary 'sitting' may refer to legislative gatherings, such as those held by the European Parliament. In these sessions, if it is not fully attended by members, it must at least achieve a quorum. Likewise, in the General Assembly of the United Nations, a Plenary Meeting requires minimum number of members to continue its procedures; and the same may apply to other groups depending on their charter or bylaws.

Some organisations have standing committees that conduct the organisation's business between congresses, conferences, or other meetings. Such committees may themselves have quorum requirements and plenary sessions. So, Standing Committees of the Northern Ireland Assembly must have a quorum of five members in order for the committee to proceed.

== See also ==
- Floor (legislative)
- Quorum
