= Decision 2026-911 (France) =

Legal ruling on France law prohibiting minors under 15 from social media

Decision No. 2026-911 DC of 14 August 2026
- Court: Constitutional Council of France
- Started: 23 July 2026
- Decided: 14 August 2026

Case opinions
- Opinion

Laws applied
- Declaration of the Rights of Man and of the Citizen on pending France law prohibiting social media for minors under 15 years of age.

Decision 2026-911 is a landmark decision from the Constitutional Council of France on the country's legally approved 2026 social media ban for minors under 15 years of age. The Council ruled that the law violated the rights of minors because the law could apply to all minors under 15 and would violate the privacy of adults because adults would have to prove their age before using social networks.

A similar legal case is pending for High Court of Australia for Australia social media ban for minors under 16.

== Aftermath ==
Since the ruling, the President of France, Emmanuel Macron, has said he will pass a new version of the law before he leaves office.

== See also ==
- Online age verification laws by country
- The Digital Freedom Project Incorporated v. Commonwealth
- Online Safety Amendment (Social Media Minimum Age) Act 2024
