= Digital Fairness Act =

EU law on dark patterns

Regulation
- European Union regulation
- Text with EEA relevance
- Title: Proposal for a Regulation of the European Parliament and of the Council on promoting fair business-to-consumer commercial practices in the offline and digital single market, and repealing Directive 2005/29/EC (Digital Fairness Act)
- Made under: Article 114 TFEU

Preparative texts
- Commission proposal: COM(2026) 1100 final (11 November 2026)
- Reports: SWD(2026) 1101 final (impact assessment)

Other legislation
- Replaces: Unfair Commercial Practices Directive

The Digital Fairness Act (DFA) is a proposed European Union regulation first tabled on 11 November 2026 by the European Commission. The regulation would replace and repeal the Unfair Commercial Practices Directive. It will apply to business to consumer commercial practices online and offline. The regulation is not an adopted regulation and is still a legislative proposal.

The proposal builds on the EU’s existing unfair commercial practices framework by introducing new rules to address commercial practices deemed problematic. The practices addressed in the regulation include dark patterns, addictive design, influencer marketing, and certain video game monetisation practices.

The proposed regulation comes after the European Commission’s Digital Fairness Fitness Check published on 3 October 2024 argued to have found gaps, legal uncertainties, and enforcement issues in existing consumer law. The proposal held a public consultation between 17 July 2025 and 24 July 2025.

Within the first two weeks around 3000 responses were sent to the public consultation, predominantly from gamers, many of whom urged the inclusion of provisions to prohibit publishers from “killing” games by permanently disabling or delisting titles consumers have bought. Campaign organiser Ross Scott has publicly highlighted the consultation as a new legislative avenue for the Stop Killing Games initiative, encouraging EU citizens to submit feedback demanding game-preservation rules that ensure purchased games remain playable even after official support ends.

== Timeline ==
- 13 November 2020: The EU Commission states that "consumers should benefit from a comparable level of protection and fairness online as they enjoy offline" in New Consumer Agenda.
- 22 February 2021: The Council of the EU adopts conclusions on New Consumer Agenda.
- 12 December 2023: The European Parliament adopts resolution on Addictive design of online services and consumer protection in the EU single market.
- 3 October 2024: EU Commission publishes final report on the Digital fairness fitness check.
- 5 November 2024: Commissioner-Designate Michael McGrath is questioned by MEPs on his plan for the Digital Fairness Act.
- 17 July 2025: European Commission opens Digital Fairness Act to public feedback.
- 24 October 2025: European Commission closes Digital Fairness Act to public feedback.
