= Ross Scott =

American YouTuber and activist

- Scott in 2026
- Born: Ross Scott; December 28, 1982 (age 43); Baton Rouge, Louisiana, U.S.
- Education: Radford University
- Notable work: Freeman's Mind, Civil Protection, Ross's Game Dungeon
- Movement: Stop Killing Games

YouTube information
- Channel: @Accursed_Farms
- Years active: 2007–present
- Genres: Machinima; game reviews; game preservation activism
- Subscribers: 434 thousand
- Views: 146 million
- Scott's voice His explanation of Stop Killing Games
- Last updated: 2026-04-15
- Website: www.accursedfarms.com

Ross William Scott (born December 28, 1982) is an American YouTuber and video game preservation activist. He is primarily known for his Half-Life machinima series Freeman's Mind and Civil Protection, as well as for starting the Stop Killing Games campaign. Scott runs the YouTube channel Accursed Farms, which hosts episodes of Freeman's Mind, its sequel Freeman's Mind 2, Civil Protection, and a video game review series Ross's Game Dungeon.

== Early life and education ==
Ross Scott was born December 28, 1982, in Baton Rouge, Louisiana. He grew up in Southwest Virginia, first in Roanoke, then in Blacksburg. Scott graduated from Radford University, earning a bachelor's degree in criminal justice with a minor in psychology. While attending Radford, Scott worked as a freelance animator and doing various odd jobs to support his first machinima project, Civil Protection.

== Internet career ==
=== Civil Protection ===
Civil Protection is a machinima comedy series created by Scott, produced using Half-Life 2 and Source SDK. The series centers on the exploits of two Combine Civil Protection officers as they navigate a futuristic dystopia under rule by aliens. The show's comedy largely derives from the contrast between the mundanity of their jobs and the darkness of the setting, covering everything from routine patrol work to absurd events.

Elaborating on writing for Civil Protection, Scott wrote that the "cornerstone" of the series was "believable human behavior. Comic situations are funnier to me if the characters treat it the way real people would as opposed to trying to ham things up or make things seem too contrived." Scott called production of Civil Protection a complicated affair, akin to "creating a small mod for a game", with each episode taking between 70 and 80 hours per week to produce.

Civil Protection debuted in 2006 on the Machinima network to high praise. PopMatters's L. B. Jeffries called it "one of the sharpest comedy series on the machinima scene and for good reason: it's genuinely funny to non-gamers. ... [It] goes far beyond the initial trapping of in-game humor and uses its game-generated setting for a legitimate story".

=== Freeman's Mind ===
Freeman's Mind is a machinima comedy series created by Scott, produced using the Source remake of the 1998 video game Half-Life. It follows the first-person perspective of the silent protagonist of the game, Gordon Freeman. Freeman is given a voice in the series by Scott, who acts as a combination of narrator and running commentary, often criticizing and satirizing the game world's conventions in a style similar to that in Mystery Science Theater 3000. According to Scott, the production workflow for Freeman's Mind was much simpler than that of Civil Protection, leading to episodes taking half as long to produce. Freeman's Mind ran from 2007 to 2014 and consisted of 71 episodes. (Note: Including three bonus episodes, numbered 0, 10.5, and 61.5) In the same year, IGN reposted the series.

A sequel series, titled Freeman's Mind 2 set in Half-Life 2, debuted in 2017 and is still ongoing. Freeman’s Mind 2 also features modifications to the original maps, adding new or changing existing set pieces and adding entirely new areas.

=== Ross's Game Dungeon ===
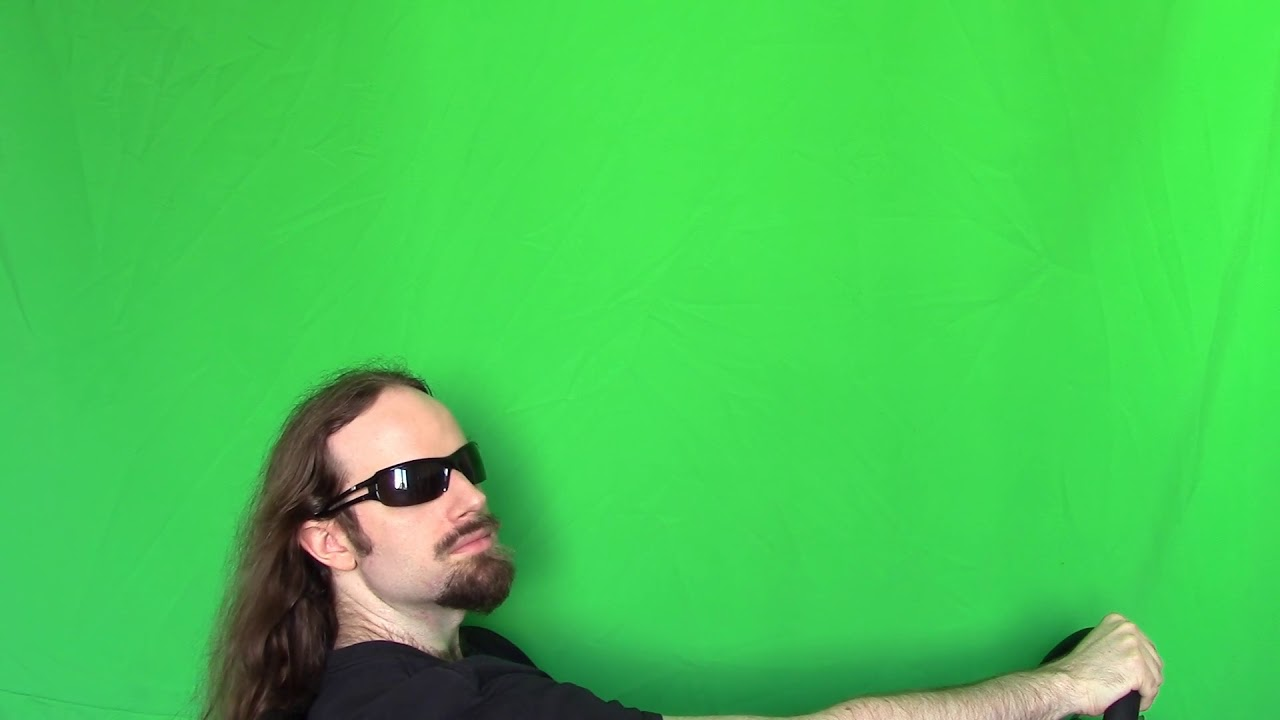
Scott in front of a green screen during the filming of an episode of Ross's Game Dungeon in 2018

Ross's Game Dungeon is a video game review series written and produced by Scott. Launched in 2013, episodes in the series have been uploaded exclusively to his YouTube channel Accursed Farms. The games showcased on Game Dungeon skew towards the obscure and forgotten, with many titles having been published in the 1990s. Many episodes in Game Dungeon also discuss the game industry itself and its practices. The German newspaper Frankfurter Allgemeine Zeitung praised the series, writing that it demonstrates Scott's "passion for gaming curiosities" and dedication to video game preservation.

=== Stop Killing Games ===
Scott is critical of online-only games being shut down, describing the practice as an "assault on both consumer rights and preservation of media" and comparing it to movie studios during the silent film era "burning their own films after they were done showing them to recover the silver content", while also pointing out that "most films of that era are gone forever." In 2019, Scott made a video criticizing games as a service, calling it "fraud", and had been openly critical of the issue on Ross's Game Dungeon for several years prior.

In April 2024, after the shutdown of the 2014 video game The Crew, Scott launched the Stop Killing Games campaign through a video on his YouTube channel, simultaneously creating a website for the campaign. The movement encourages users to vote on petitions to force developers into providing ways to play games after the end of support, such as adding an offline mode or an ability to host private servers. He also encouraged multiple petitions for Stop Killing Games, such as the Directorate General for Competition, Consumer Affairs and Fraud Protection in France, the UK Parliament petition, and the European Citizens' Initiative in the European Union, the latter of which gained over 350,000 signatures in the first two months.

Scott expected the movement to fail when the European Citizens' Initiative stagnated at 45% of the amount necessary for government action to be taken, which he attributed in part to opposition and misinformation about the campaign by YouTuber Jason Hall, also known as PirateSoftware. The movement has seen some success in Europe, where the European Citizens' Initiative closed with over 1.4 million signatures, 97% of which were considered to be valid. The movement has seen less success in the UK, which prompted a debate in UK Parliament following a petition of almost 190,000 signatures. The movement saw support by some members of parliament, but it was ultimately decided no changes would be made to UK law, stating that the government would instead work with game companies to ensure accurate information is provided to consumers.

Scott would figurehead this movement through videos uploaded to his YouTube channel and interviews with the press throughout 2024 and 2025. He would continue to do so until August 2025, when he announced he would take a "standby break", in which he would only contribute to the campaign if something were to arise that he felt would benefit from his involvement. On April 16, 2026, Scott took part as a speaker in the European Parliament debate on Stop Killing Games following the success of the European Citizens' Initiative.

== Personal life ==
Scott briefly lived in Los Angeles, California, starting in 2008 while working a full-time job at Machinima, Inc., to produce his content. He had previously worked for the company on a freelance basis since submitting episodes of Civil Protection to them in 2006. Scott produced roughly 60 videos for the Machinima network before abruptly quitting the company in 2013, citing an "unethical and predatory" workplace environment. He sued the company in the same year; the two parties settled out of court by the end of 2013. Scott currently resides in Poland.

== Filmography ==
=== Web series ===
Year	Title	Role	Notes
2006–2012	Civil Protection	Mike	Creator
2007–2014	Freeman's Mind	Gordon Freeman	Creator
2013–present	Ross's Game Dungeon	Himself	Creator
2017–present	Freeman's Mind 2	Gordon Freeman	Creator
2025	Crash	Joe	Episode: "Roadside Picnic"

=== Video games ===
Year	Title	Role	Notes
2015	Half-Life 2: Update	Community Commentary Mode	Mod for Half-Life 2
