= Freeman's Mind =

Machinima series in Half-Life

- Genre: Comedy
- Created by: Ross Scott
- Based on: Half-Life: Source and Half-Life 2 by Valve
- Original language: English
- No. of seasons: 2
- No. of episodes: 95

Production
- Running time: 2-18 minutes (first season)

Original release
- Release: December 4, 2007 – December 31, 2014
- Release: April 1, 2017 – present

Freeman's Mind is a machinima series created by Ross Scott. Freeman's Mind used the Source remake of the 1998 video game Half-Life. It follows the protagonist of the game, Gordon Freeman, who acts as a combination of narrator and running commentary, often criticizing and satirizing the game world's conventions in a style similar to that in Mystery Science Theater 3000. Freeman's Mind ran from 2007 to 2014 and consisted of 71 episodes. (Note: Including the zeroth episode and two bonus ones) It was hosted on Machinima until 2014. A sequel series, titled Freeman's Mind 2 set in Half-Life 2, debuted in 2017, and is still ongoing. In 2014, IGN reposted Freeman's Mind to their website.

== Synopsis ==
Freeman's Mind follows the protagonist of the game, Gordon Freeman, also voiced by Scott, who acts as a combination of narrator and running commentary, often criticizing and satirizing the game world's conventions in a style similar to that in Mystery Science Theater 3000.

== Production ==
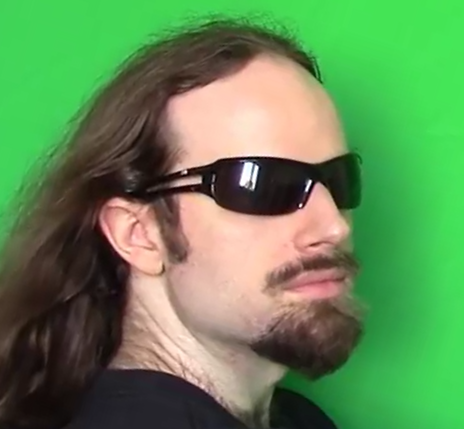
Ross Scott (pictured in 2018)

Structurally, Freeman's Mind is filmed from the first person perspective of Gordon Freeman. All of the visuals and most of the animations come from the original game; however, many scenes of the series are manipulated through the use of cheats and mods to the game's engine.

Often, Gordon avoids places where the player is usually forced to go. For example, Gordon performs pull-ups throughout the series to navigate to otherwise inaccessible areas. A typical way to film this is through the use of the noclip mode.

Freeman’s Mind 2 also features modifications to the original maps, adding new or changing existing set pieces and adding entirely new areas.

=== Writing ===
Ross Scott describes Gordon's personality as having "shifting paranoia, egomania, mild schizophrenia, over-aggressiveness, petty motivations, and immaturity in general", and that "the only hint I thought they gave to his personality was how proficient he immediately was in weaponry for being a physicist."

Emily Rose, writing for Ars Technica, used "neurotic panicked narcissist" to describe the character; this is a depiction she noticed in a similar series—Half-Life VR but the AI Is Self-Aware.

== Release ==
Freeman's Mind ran from 2007 to 2014 and consisted of 71 episodes. The series was hosted on Machinima until 2014. A sequel series, titled Freeman's Mind 2 set in Half-Life 2, debuted in 2017, and is still ongoing.

== Legacy ==
In 2014, IGN reposted Freeman's Mind to their website. In 2015, Scott contributed to the Community Commentary mode for the Half Life 2 Mod, Half-Life 2: Update. Zack Zwiezen of Kotaku said they were a "huge fan of Freeman’s Mind."
