= Resonance: A Plague Tale Legacy =

2026 video game

- Developer: Asobo Studio
- Publisher: Focus Entertainment
- Director: David Dedeine
- Artist: Olivier Ponsonnet
- Writer: Carol Ann Bañuls
- Composer: Olivier Deriviere
- Series: A Plague Tale
- Engine: Zouna
- Platforms: PlayStation 5; Windows; Xbox Series X/S
- Release: 27 August 2026
- Genre: Action-adventure
- Mode: Single-player

Resonance: A Plague Tale Legacy is an action-adventure game developed by Asobo Studio and published by Focus Entertainment. It is the third installment in the A Plague Tale series and a prequel to A Plague Tale: Innocence (2019). The game was released in August 2026 for PlayStation 5, Windows, and Xbox Series X/S. It received positive reviews from critics.

== Gameplay ==
Resonance: A Plague Tale Legacy is an action-adventure game played from a third-person perspective. Previous A Plague Tale titles were primarily focused on stealth while Resonance is more action-oriented. In Resonance, the player takes control of the much more capable Sophia. Sophia can parry enemy attacks and counter them with deadly finishing moves.

Resonance introduces a dual-timeline mechanic where the player can switch between the Middle Ages and Minoan period. Events in the Minoan past can affect the present day of the Middle Ages.

== Plot ==
=== Setting ===
In 1334, 15 years before the events of A Plague Tale: Innocence, smuggler Sophia (Anna Demetriou) discovers her connection to the Prima Macula's ancient history.

=== Synopsis ===
As a young girl, Sophia was sent to a convent by her mother where the nuns there injected her with a mysterious substance. As a result, she began to experience various visions, particularly that of a Greek warrior standing in front of a set of large doors. The nuns then forced Sophia to draw everything she saw in her visions, until her father Alec raided the convent with his bandit army and rescued her. Alec promised to find the truth behind Sophia's visions, but ended up perishing in one of his expeditions. Alec's lieutenant Faro took up leadership of the bandits and honored his promise to Alec to take care of Sophia.

Many years later, Sophia has grown into a young woman and formidable fighter. Faro reveals his investigations have led to the conclusion that Sophia's visions are focused on the island of Crete, though they first need to obtain a special key being stored in Venice. Sophia accompanies Faro's raiding party but they are led into a trap, as the Venetian army had been tipped off by a traitor. Sophia manages to recover the key, a mechanical orb, and is forced to leave her fellow bandits behind as she flees the city. Upon returning to the hideout, she finds it in flames as it is also attacked by the Venetian army. She manages to escape with her friend Leni, but not before having to fight their way past a furious Faro who believes Sophia is the traitor.

Sophia and Leni make their way to Crete and find the doors in Sophia's visions, which lead to the ruins of the ancient Minoan civilization. Sophia's visions and the orb guide her deeper through a Minoan labyrinth, all while Faro and his surviving bandits as well as the Venetian army arrive to plunder whatever treasure they believe is hidden in the center of the labyrinth. After being cornered by Faro, Sophia is separated from Leni and falls down a pit, where she discovers the presence of massive black plant-like tendrils that devour any person they catch, but are sensitive to light. Sophia manages to reunite with Faro and Leni, but the tendrils breach the surface and begin devouring everybody in sight including Leni, the bandits, and the Venetian soldiers. A thick cloud then emanates from the center of the labyrinth that threatens to block out the sun permanently. Sophia and Faro work together to activate ancient mechanisms to channel a beam of light into the center of the labyrinth to kill the beast within, but are ambushed by the traitor, Faro's lieutenant Irene. Sophia slays Irene, but Faro is mortally wounded and volunteers to keep the light beam pointed at the labyrinth.

As she makes way to the center of the labyrinth, Sophia finally begins to make sense of the various visions she had been receiving after communing with the spirit of Ariadne. In ancient times, Ariadne's father King Minos imprisoned her brother Asterion in the labyrinth due to being a carrier of the Prima Macula. Minos proceeded to dub Asterion the Minotaur and began to invite warriors from all over Greece to engage in gladiatorial combat to the death, with the last warrior standing having an opportunity to slay the Minotaur and become Minos' heir. Ariadne, being Asterion's protector, entered the competition posing as Theseus and begged Minos and her people to end Asterion's suffering rather than use him as an excuse for bloodsport. Minos instead killed Ariadne. Between Asterion sensing his sister's death and Ariadne's ally Daedalus deactivating the labyrinth's defenses, Asterion went berserk and destroyed the entire Minoan civilization.

Having told her story, Ariadne pleads with Sophia to end Asterion's suffering, as it will also cure the infection the nuns injected into Sophia's arm. Sophia fights her way into the center of the labyrinth where she finds Asterion's body fully merged with the Prima Macula. She uses the orb to immolate Asterion's body, removing the Macula infection on Crete. Exiting the labyrinth, Sophia discovers Faro used the last of his life marking the location of Alec's corpse. After leaving behind a golden crown in Faro's hand, Sophia commandeers a ship and departs the island.

In a post-credits scene, Sophia finishes recounting the entire story to Amicia, who posits the nuns were part of the Order who were trying to find Asterion's location. She then asks Sophia how she met Arnaud, but Sophia insists that it is a long story for another time.

== Development ==
After a follow-up had been teased in A Plague Tale: Requiem's post-credits scene, Asobo sought a creative reorientation as they had spent the previous seven years working with the same characters such as Amicia and Hugo de Rune. Game director David Dedeine said the team wanted to "keep things fresh" and "preserve that creative spark" by taking a new direction to move the series forward. Dedeine said that Resonance "changes everything" with a greater emphasis on combat paired with a new setting and protagonist. The character of Sophia had been introduced in Requiem, joining Amicia and Hugo on their quest. Resonance explores Sophia's backstory as a prequel. It leaves behind Middle Ages France for the Greek island of Crete where Sophia grew up.

Resonance was developed in Zouna, Asobo Studio's in-house proprietary game engine. Asobo chose not to use generative AI in the development of Resonance: A Plague Tale Legacy, seeing it as a threat to creativity and authenticity. Producer Eric Chort called the use of generative AI a "choice" in game development and did not see it as a "solution" for its relatively small team of around 70 to compete with larger development teams in the AAA space.

=== Gameplay design ===
Prior to Resonance, Asobo had no previous experience with developing melee-based combat but felt that its inclusion was important for telling Sophia's story. The studio was forced to learn how to make a combat system during development on Resonance. Lead level designer Valérian Robert cited Ghost of Tsushima, Sekiro: Shadows Die Twice and Sifu as influencing the combat mechanics in Resonance. The combat system initially developed was more difficult than intended and had to be scaled back as Asobo was aware that loyal A Plague Tale players were coming from a stealth game. Robert said that they wanted a "challenging" combat system that can still be enjoyed by players unfamiliar with soulslike games.

=== Music ===
Resonance: A Plague Tale Legacy's music was composed by Olivier Deriviere, returning from his work on A Plague Tale: Innocence and A Plague Tale: Requiem. Deriviere realised that a new musical approach was needed for Resonance due to its setting in Crete. Deriviere wrote the lyrics in French and they were translated to Cypriot Greek with help from collaborators. The music was recorded with the Amalgamation Choir, a choir of 20 female Greek Cypriot vocalists led by Vasiliki Anastasiou singing in their native language. Traditional instruments such as the Yaylı tambur and rebab spike fiddles were used. The first track from the soundtrack to be released was "The Land" on 16 June 2026. Deriviere said the track is about "place of origin" and how Sophia's identity and where she comes from stays with her throughout her journey. "Patera", meaning 'father' in Greek, was released on 30 June.

== Release ==
Resonance: A Plague Tale Legacy was announced at Summer Game Fest on 8 June 2025 as part of the Xbox Games Showcase. The game's announcement had leaked a day earlier. It was released on 27 August 2026, for PlayStation 5, Windows and Xbox Series X/S. It became available at launch on Xbox Game Pass.

== Reception ==
Reception

Aggregate scores
Aggregator	Score
Metacritic	PC: 85/100; PS5: 78/100; XSXS: 83/100
OpenCritic	82% recommend

Resonance: A Plague Tale Legacy received "generally favorable" reviews from critics, according to review aggregator Metacritic. OpenCritic determined that 82% of critics recommended the game.

=== Accolades ===
Year	Award	Category	Result	Ref.
2025	43rd Golden Joystick Awards	Most Wanted Game	Nominated	
2026	44th Golden Joystick Awards	Best Visual Design	Nominated	
2026	44th Golden Joystick Awards	Best Lead Performer (Anna Demetriou as Sophia)	Nominated	
