= A Plague Tale =

Video game series

- Genres: Action-adventure game, stealth game
- Developer: Asobo Studio
- Publisher: Focus Entertainment
- First release: A Plague Tale: Innocence; 14 May 2019
- Latest release: Resonance: A Plague Tale Legacy; 27 August 2026

A Plague Tale is a historical action-adventure and stealth video game series developed by Asobo Studio and published by Focus Entertainment. Set during the Black Death in 14th-century France, the series follows siblings Amicia and Hugo de Rune as they struggle to survive amid war, plague, and the supernatural curse known as the Prima Macula. The games combine stealth, puzzle-solving, and narrative-driven gameplay, often featuring swarms of rats as a central gameplay mechanic.

== Games ==
Release timeline
2019	A Plague Tale: Innocence
2020–2021
2022	A Plague Tale: Requiem
2023–2025
2026	Resonance: A Plague Tale Legacy

=== A Plague Tale: Innocence (2019) ===
Innocence was released on 14 May 2019 for Windows, PlayStation 4, and Xbox One. The game follows Amicia de Rune as she protects her younger brother Hugo from the Inquisition while uncovering the secrets of his mysterious illness, the Prima Macula.

=== A Plague Tale: Requiem (2022) ===
Requiem was released on 18 October 2022 for Windows, PlayStation 5, Xbox Series X/S, and Nintendo Switch (cloud version). Set several months after the events of Innocence, the game follows Amicia and Hugo as they travel through southern France in search of a cure for Hugo's condition.

=== Resonance: A Plague Tale Legacy (2026) ===
Resonance: A Plague Tale Legacy is a prequel to the first two games. It was announced in June 2025 and was released on 27 August 2026.

== Gameplay ==
The A Plague Tale games are played from a third-person perspective and combine stealth, environmental puzzles, crafting, and action-adventure mechanics. Light plays a major role in gameplay, as swarms of plague-carrying rats avoid illuminated areas. Players use tools such as slings, alchemical mixtures, and later crossbows to overcome enemies and obstacles.

== Development ==
The series is developed by French studio Asobo Studio and published by Focus Entertainment. The developers drew inspiration from medieval France, the Black Death, and historical conflicts of the 14th century. The franchise gained recognition for its narrative focus, character performances, and unique rat swarm technology.

== Reception ==
The series has received generally positive reviews from critics, who praised its storytelling, atmosphere, visual presentation, and performances. Amicia and Hugo's relationship has been cited as one of the strongest aspects of the franchise, while the rat swarm mechanics became a defining feature of the series.

== See also ==
- Asobo Studio
- Focus Entertainment
