= Viking Destiny =

- Seize Your Destiny
- Directed by: David L.G. Hughes
- Written by: David L.G. Hughes; Andee Ryder
- Produced by: David L.G. Hughes
- Starring: Terence Stamp; Anna Demetriou; Paul Freeman; Will Mellor; Murray McArthur; Ian Beattie
- Cinematography: Sara Deane
- Edited by: Lloyd George
- Music by: Tom Morrison
- Distributed by: Saban Films
- Release date: 30 July 2018
- Running time: 91 minutes
- Country: United Kingdom
- Language: English

Viking Destiny (also known as Of Gods and Warriors) is a 2018 film directed by David L.G. Hughes. The film was released on 5 October 2018 by Fatal Black and Saban Films.

== Plot ==
A Viking Princess (Demetriou) is forced to flee her kingdom after being framed for the murder of her father the King. Under the guidance of the god Odin (Terence Stamp), she travels the world gaining wisdom and building the army she needs to win back her throne.

== Production ==
Filmed between 8 June and 12 July 2017 at Leslie Hill, Red Hall, Ballycarry, and O'Harabrook House near Ballymoney in Northern Ireland.

== Critical reception ==
The film was largely negatively received by reviewers. The Guardian's Cath Clarke described it as "fantastically wooden and dodgily acted" and Jeannette Catsoulis of The New York Times summed it up as "low-budget Nordic nonsense". In contrast James Hanton of Starburst asserted that, of the Viking movies in circulation, "this one punches above its weight in comparison to many" and Flash Bang Film Review commented that it "delivers a very high standard of action in front of the camera and strong filmatism [sic] behind it.".

== Cast ==
- Anna Demetriou as Princess Helle of Volsung
- Terence Stamp as Odin
- Murray McArthur as Loki
- Will Mellor as Lord Soini
- Paul Freeman as Tarburn
- Ian Beattie as Kirkwood
- Andrew Whipp as King Asmund of Volsung
- Timo Nieminen as Prince Bard of Volsung
- Martyn Ford as Torstein / Steiner
- Victoria Broom as Queen Alva of Volsung
- Laurence O'Fuarain as Vern
- Kajsa Mohammar as Tait

== Released ==
In 2018, the film was released on DVD in the United States (Region 1 format) and streamed on Netflix in 2019.
