= Space Odyssey: The Video Game =

Upcoming sandbox video game

- Developer: Space Media Ventures
- Platforms: Windows, macOS, Linux, iOS, Android
- Genre: 4X
- Mode: Single-player

Space Odyssey: The Video Game is a proposed sandbox video game with 4X elements developed by Space Media Ventures for Windows, macOS, Linux, iOS, and Android systems, including virtual reality devices. The game is being co-developed by astrophysicist Neil deGrasse Tyson, and has some educational aspects as the player designs and grows parts of a virtual galaxy.

== Gameplay ==
Players in Space Odyssey are tasked with creating solar systems and larger stellar bodies in a virtual galaxy. This not only includes defining the planetary bodies within the system, but managing a spacefaring species as it harvests resources from those stellar bodies to expand its civilization through research, production, and trade to make said civilization successful. The game provides various challenges to players that, if completed successfully, reward them with items to further help their species. Players will be able to share their creations with others and visit the systems that others have made. Initial ideas for the game include a virtual assistant voiced by Tyson and a story that begins on Proxima B.

== Development ==
Space Odyssey is being developed by Space Media Ventures, and is a cooperative development including SMV's Creative Director, Mark Murphy and astrophysicist Neil deGrasse Tyson. According to Murphy, the goal of the game is to provide an experience similar to Minecraft and Civilization to encourage players to explore space. While they recognize they wanted to make an educational game, Murphy said that they did not want it to be reduced to a series of quizzes or an open-ended world without any instruction, but instead make for a fun and interesting challenge to players of all ages. Tyson was originally skeptical towards the idea when the studio approached him, believing the game was aimed at young players, but they demonstrated their plans to target the game for all ages, bringing him aboard the project.

Tyson has input in the design of the game's challenges. The game is driven by real science and real physics, aspects which Tyson found crucial to creating a unique and compelling gaming experience. Further, Tyson, along with groups like Bigelow Aerospace and National Space Society have been consulted on the game to help provide ideas for realistic future technologies to be employed by the player. Tyson has worked with several guests from his talk show, StarTalk, to help provide material in-game to relate the science and understanding of game elements to the player. With the ability to share stellar systems among players, the developers have gotten Tyson, Len Wein, StarTalk All-Stars, and Peter Beagle to participate in creating their own systems that players can visit and study.

The title was announced in October 2016, and Space Media Ventures hosted an All-Star Panel featuring Tyson, James Gunn, Kiki Wolfkill, Randy Pitchford and moderated by Chris Hardwick to launch the community build of the game during Electronic Entertainment Expo 2017. To help support development, the team started a Kickstarter crowdfunding campaign to raise $314,159 in mid-June 2017. It was also being crowdfunded on Indiegogo.

In April 2020, it was announced that development on the project had been delayed owing to lack of funding. The apologies above also mention that the Kickstarter and Indiegogo funding "[...] was to introduce the vision for the game to the community and seed early development.". The post also mentions that the raised funding was not enough to develop the videogame even though the Kickstarter campaign had "Beta Tester & Full Game Download" as an option.

On 2022, Ben Hason on his YouTube channel did a video adding comments from people who were in theory involved in the development. Cecil Kim (involved as an artist design) said in this interview that he was never in touch with Neil deGrasse Tyson himself on this project. Also said that the scope of the game did not seem to be properly defined at the time he was involved. He never talked again to Mark Murphy after the Kickstarter campaign was done. Similarly, the same happened with Big Red Button entertainment (the development team) who was not involved in Space Odyssey after the Kickstarter campaign ended.

No new updates have been given since the last post on Kickstarter, which was posted in 2020.

== See also ==
- Kerbal Space Program
