= E3 2017 =

23rd annual Electronic Entertainment Expo

Electronic Entertainment Expo 2017
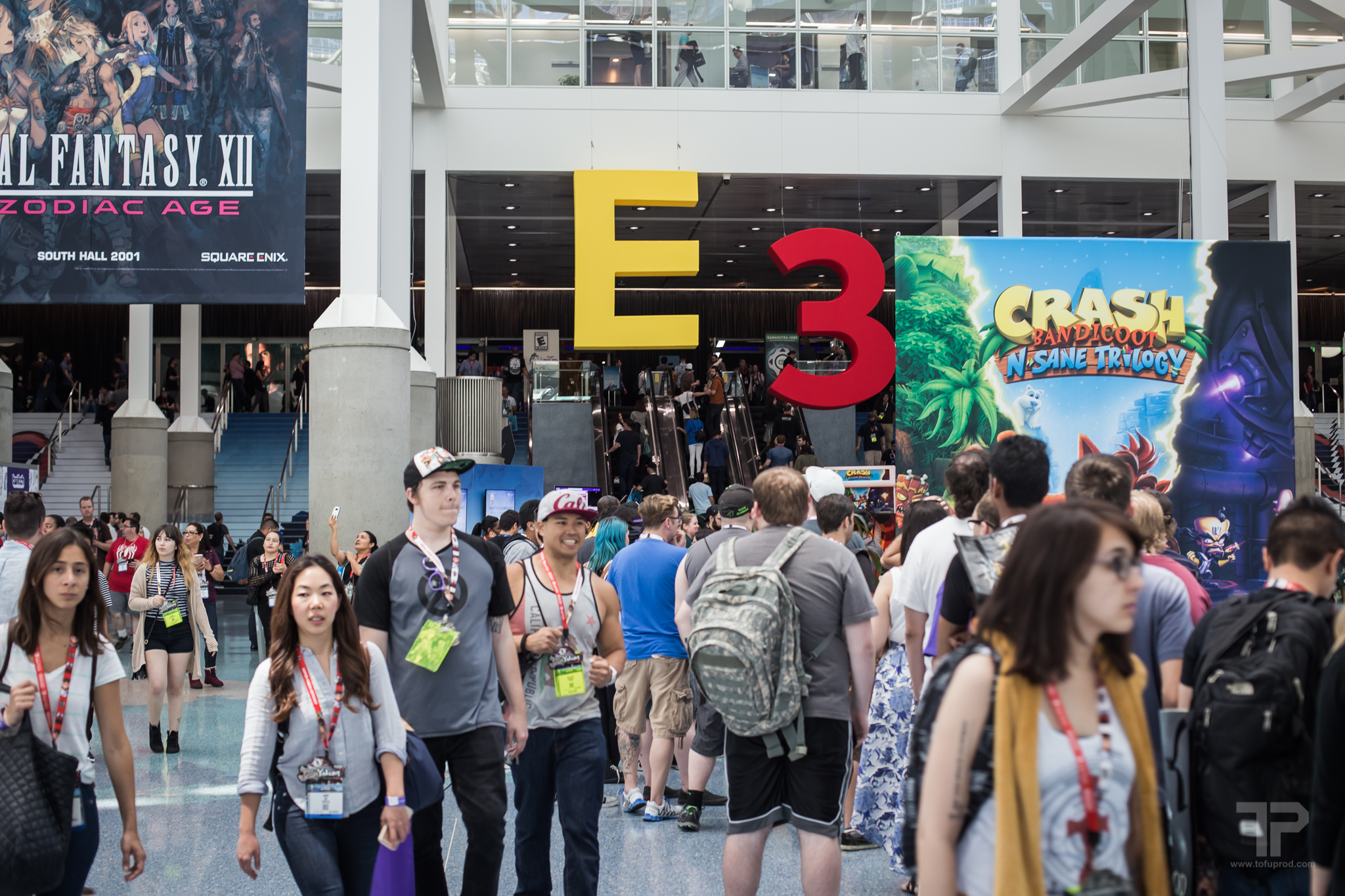
- Genre: Video game industry
- Begins: June 13, 2017
- Ends: June 15, 2017
- Venue: Los Angeles Convention Center
- Locations: Los Angeles, California
- Country: United States
- Previous event: E3 2016
- Next event: E3 2018
- Attendance: 68,400
- Organizer: Entertainment Software Association
- Filing status: Non-profit

The Electronic Entertainment Expo 2017 (E3 2017) was the 23rd E3, during which hardware manufacturers and software developers and publishers from the video game industry presented new and upcoming products to the attendees, primarily retailers and members of the video game press. The event, organized by the Entertainment Software Association (ESA), took place at the Los Angeles Convention Center from June 13–15, 2017. It was the first E3 to allow public access to the event, and as a result, the total attendance was about 68,400 which included 15,000 in public passes.

The event occurred following the release of the Nintendo Switch three months earlier, and the announcement of the hardware refresh of the Xbox One, the Xbox One X, released five months after the event. As such, there was little of the show devoted to hardware and was mostly focused on upcoming games for them. The events affirmed a trend in virtual reality-based games alongside new intellectual property and franchise expansions.

== Format and changes ==
E3 is the video game industry's primary retail showcase for the North American market, aimed at retailers and video game journalists, with the announcements and coverage widely reported through online gaming websites and streaming media. As with previous E3 events, E3 2017 would begin with press conferences held by several major publishers in the days just prior to the event proper (June 11 and 12), providing details on new games and products they anticipating shipping within the year. The event then opens at the Los Angeles Convention Center on June 13, allowing the attendees to spend time in the show's exhibit hall where publishers and developers would have booths available to demonstrate their new games. Several publishers and developers also have closed-door presentations to attendees or allow for private interviews or demonstrations on some products.

While the event has traditionally been open only to members of the video game industry and press, E3 2017 offered 15,000 public passes for the event, with sales starting in February 2017 and sold out by mid-May. The move was broadly supported by publishers and analysts, who see the influence of gamers' own experiences with hands-on demonstration spread through word-of-mouth as valuable as media presentations and interviews. Additionally, E3 allowed exhibitors to sell goods, including software, hardware, and related merchandise, directly from the show floor, as long as they pre-registered their intents and followed rules for vending set by the ESA.

ESA reported a total of 68,400 attendees for E3 2017, including the 15,000 public tickets, up from 50,300 in 2016. The expanded audience created significant crowding within the convention; the ESA had to open the convention doors 15 minutes early on the first day due to the lineup of attendees that was creating a fire hazard. Participants noted difficulties in navigating the show floor and waiting in long lines to access demonstration booths.

Commentators felt that this E3 presented a potential turning point for future events. Many observed that the press conferences had very few live presentations, guest presenters, and game demonstrations, instead offering series of game trailers and pre-recorded footage. They felt this was partially to avoid flubs that have happened in the past during E3 presentations, and to provide an experience more amenable to broadcasting and streaming for those not attending the event. With the numerous public passes, the added crowds made accessing developer and publisher booths difficult. Attendees, both press and public, felt that neither the E3 organizers nor the developers and publishers presenting on the show floor were ready from the larger crowds, with few cohesive processes in place. Alongside the large public presence, this leads the event to be more situated towards avid gaming fans and influential streamers, making the relevancy of the press component at the event less important; instead, press reporters can engage with publishers and developers away and outside the duration of E3 to gain the same information they would normally get at E3. Some commentators felt that it is not feasible to build an E3 to serve both types of audiences, and suggested other options such as creating sequential events, one dedicated to press, and other to gamers, which also eases the costs to exhibitors. Ben Kuchera for Polygon expressed concern that the PAX events were already in place to serve as video game marketing hype for fans, and E3 should not try to replicate the PAX experience. To alleviate some of these concerns, ESA announced that for the 2018 E3 event, exhibitor halls would have a few hours exclusive to industry members on two of the days prior to opening these to the public passes.

== Press conferences ==
=== Electronic Arts ===
Electronic Arts (EA) held a press conference on June 10 at 12:00 pm from the Hollywood Palladium, as part of its standalone EA Play event; as in 2016, EA would not be having a presence at E3 itself.

The conference featured presentations of the new titles A Way Out (which was developed by Josef Fares of Brothers: A Tale of Two Sons fame), Need for Speed Payback, and Star Wars Battlefront II. BioWare also teased a new project, Anthem, which was elaborated further during Microsoft's press event the next day. EA also showcased new instalments in its sports franchises, including FIFA 18, Madden NFL 18, and NBA Live 18, as well as additional DLC for Battlefield 1.

=== Microsoft ===
Microsoft hosted its 2017 press conference on June 11 at 2:00 pm from the Galen Center. Unlike previous editions of E3, where Microsoft traditionally held its event on the Monday prior to the expo, the company moved its conference back to Sunday so that its announcements would not be overshadowed by those of other conferences traditionally held the same day, such as Ubisoft and Sony Interactive Entertainment. Microsoft also desired to regain its title of having the "first" E3 press conference, acknowledging that Bethesda had begun to hold E3 press events on Sunday as well. The conference was streamed in 4K on Mixer.

Microsoft officially unveiled Xbox One X (first teased in 2016 under its codename "Project Scorpio"), a high-end model in the Xbox One family optimized for 4K ultra high-definition gaming. 42 games were covered in total, with 20 titles exclusive to Xbox One. Among its first-party games included Crackdown 3, Forza Motorsport 7, Ori and the Will of the Wisps, Sea of Thieves, and State of Decay 2. As part of its reveal with Forza Motorsport 7, Microsoft announced a teaming with Porsche for the video game series, and premiered Porsche's new 911 GT2 RS car during their conference. Microsoft announced that it would extend its current backwards compatibility program to extend to original Xbox games.

Microsoft would also hold a limited-attendance "Fan Fest" event during E3.

=== Bethesda ===
Bethesda Softworks held an E3 presentation on June 11 at 7:00 pm. Virtual reality titles based on Doom and Fallout 4 were announced. New content for The Elder Scrolls Online and The Elder Scrolls: Legends were announced, along with the sequels Dishonored: Death of the Outsider, The Evil Within 2 and Wolfenstein II: The New Colossus. Amiibo compatibility for the Nintendo Switch version of The Elder Scrolls V: Skyrim was announced, too, including support for some The Legend of Zelda: Breath of the Wild Amiibo. The company also announced its "Creation Club", a system for user-generate content to be provided to players for a fee on personal computers, PlayStation 4, and Xbox One to expand both Skyrim and Fallout 4.

=== Devolver Digital ===
In past years, Devolver Digital had normally held an event alongside E3, including its Indie Megabooth, at a privately owned lot within walking distance of the Convention Center. This year with the added public passes, Devolver had planned to expand the event to an adjacent city parking lot that looked across from the Convention Center, normally used in the past by ESA for parking and storage, and had already secured license to use space. However, as the convention drew near, the City of Los Angeles revoked the license for this lot when they learned it would be used for public events, forcing Devolver to cancel some events and squeeze other presenters, including their Megabooth, into the tight spaces between the private lot and their allotted convention floor space. Devolver has had a history of confrontation with ESA, and Devolver's co-founder Mike Wilson had accused the ESA of being involved with the city's revocation of the license, but ESA denied it had that type of influence within the city.

Devolver also announced that they would hold their first-ever press conference on June 11 at 10:00 pm, streamed as part of Twitch's "Pre-Pre Show" on their E3-focused channel. However, the company stated that no new games would be unveiled, and that it would feature an appearance by Suda51. The "conference" was actually a 15-minute, pre-recorded sketch satirizing the video game industry and cliches associated with E3 press conferences (including an overenthusiastic audience that the presenter silences by shooting a gun into the air, and the unveiling of "Screen Pay" technology allowing users to pay for games by literally throwing money at their monitor), leading Polygon to compare it to watching a "magical infomercial" on Adult Swim. Although no new games were unveiled, new trailers for Ruiner and Serious Sam's Bogus Detour were featured in the presentation.

Devolver's presentation was conceived about a month before the event between Nigel Lowrie of Devolver and Don Thacker of Imagos Films, a production company that has made live-action trailers for Devolver's products. They recognized they had only 15 minutes in which to deliver jokes and a statement about the ridiculousness of the state of the E3 events without necessarily insulting anyone in particular. They hired actress Mahria Zook to play the fictional Nina Struthers stated to be Devolver's Chief Synergy Officer. Struthers was designed as a villainous and over-the-top caricature of a stereotypical video game marketing executive. Zook gains attention after her appearance in this presentation as a result of her portrayal as Struthers.

=== PC Gaming Show ===
PC Gamer hosted their third PC Gaming Show on June 12 at 10:00 am from the Ace Hotel. The show focused primarily on titles for personal computers (PCs). The show was hosted by Sean Plott and sponsored by Intel, and included presentations from Bluehole, Bohemia Interactive, Creative Assembly, Firaxis Games, Klei Entertainment, Cygames, Microsoft, Nexon, Paradox Interactive, Raw Fury, and Tripwire Interactive.

=== Ubisoft ===
Ubisoft held its press conference on June 12 at 1:00 pm. It covered sequels to its primary franchises, including Assassin's Creed Origins, Far Cry 5, Just Dance 2018, and The Crew 2. A new trailer for Beyond Good and Evil 2, a game that was believed to be in development hell, was also unveiled. Ubisoft also unveiled its collaboration with Nintendo, Mario + Rabbids Kingdom Battle. They also announced their new IP, such as Skull & Bones, Starlink: Battle for Atlas, Steep: Road to the Olympics.

=== Sony ===
Sony Interactive Entertainment hosted its press conference on June 12 at 6:00 pm from the Shrine Auditorium; in addition to online streaming, it again offered the "PlayStation E3 Experience" and simultaneously broadcast the conference to a number of movie theaters. The presentation focused primarily on software titles, including Sony's first-party games God of War, Days Gone, Uncharted: The Lost Legacy, Gran Turismo Sport, Detroit: Become Human, Horizon Zero Dawn: The Frozen Wilds, and Marvel's Spider-Man. A number of PlayStation VR games were announced, including The Inpatient, Star Child, Bravo Team, and Moss. They announced a remake of the PlayStation 2 title, Shadow of the Colossus. In addition, Sony featured titles from third-parties, including Capcom's Monster Hunter: World and Marvel vs. Capcom: Infinite, and Activision's Destiny 2 and Call of Duty: WWII.

In addition, Sony streamed "PlayStation Live from E3 2017" events over the remaining three days of the convention.

=== Nintendo ===
Nintendo streamed a pre-recorded Nintendo Spotlight presentation on June 13 at 9:00 am; Nintendo exhibited new and extended trailers for Fire Emblem Warriors, Super Mario Odyssey, and Xenoblade Chronicles 2, along with new, untitled entries in the Kirby and Yoshi franchises for Nintendo Switch. It was also announced that Metroid Prime 4 and a new "core" game in the Pokémon franchise were in development for Switch, and that Rocket League was also being ported to Switch with cross-platform multiplayer with PCs and supported console platforms, and exclusive Nintendo-themed items. During a Nintendo Treehouse Live stream that followed the presentation, Nintendo additionally unveiled remakes of Metroid II: Return of Samus (titled Metroid: Samus Returns) and Mario & Luigi: Superstar Saga (titled Mario & Luigi: Superstar Saga + Bowser's Minions) for Nintendo 3DS, and presented an extended demo of Super Mario Odyssey. On June 14, Nintendo unveiled another upcoming Nintendo 3DS and Nintendo Switch title, Sushi Striker: The Way of Sushido.

== List of featured games ==
This is a list of notable titles that appeared by their developers or publishers at E3 2017.

704Games: NASCAR Heat 2 (PC / PS4 / Xbox One); Activision: Call of Duty: WWII (PC / PS4 / Xbox One); Crash Bandicoot N. Sane Trilogy (PS4); Destiny 2 (PC / PS4 / Xbox One); Annapurna Interactive: The Artful Escape (PC / Xbox One); Ashen (PC / Xbox One); Atlus: 13 Sentinels: Aegis Rim (PS4 / Vita); Etrian Odyssey V: Beyond the Myth (3DS); Radiant Historia: Perfect Chronology (3DS); Shin Megami Tensei: Strange Journey Redux (3DS); Bandai Namco Entertainment: Ace Combat 7: Skies Unknown (PC / Xbox One / PS4); Code Vein (PC / PS4 / Xbox One); Dragon Ball FighterZ (PC / PS4 / Xbox One); Gundam Versus (PS4); Ni no Kuni II: Revenant Kingdom (PC / PS4); Project CARS 2 (PC / PS4 / Xbox One); Bethesda Softworks: Dishonored 2: Death of the Outsider (PC / PS4 / Xbox One); Doom VFR (PC); The Elder Scrolls: Legends (Android / iOS / PC); The Elder Scrolls Online (PC / PS4 / Xbox One); The Elder Scrolls V: Skyrim (PC / PS4 / Switch / Xbox One); The Evil Within 2 (PC / PS4 / Xbox One); Fallout 4 VR (PC); Quake Champions (PC); Wolfenstein II: The New Colossus (PC / PS4 / Xbox One); Bluehole: PlayerUnknown's Battlegrounds (PC / Xbox One); Capcom: Marvel vs. Capcom: Infinite (PC / PS4 / Xbox One); Monster Hunter: World (PC / PS4 / Xbox One); Coffee Stain Studios: Deep Rock Galactic (PC / Xbox One); Crytek: Hunt: Showdown (PC / PS4 / Xbox One); Deep Silver: Agents of Mayhem (PC / PS4 / Xbox One); Kingdom Come: Deliverance (PC / PS4 / Xbox One); Metro Exodus (PC / PS4 / Xbox One); Devolver Digital: Absolver (PC / PS4 / Xbox One); Ape Out (PC); Enter the Gungeon (PC / PS4 / Switch / Xbox One); Ruiner (PC / PS4 / Xbox One); Serious Sam's Bogus Detour (PC); The Swords of Ditto (PC / PS4); Dovetail Games: Flight Sim World (PC); Electronic Arts: Anthem (PC / PS4 / Xbox One); Battlefield 1 (PC / PS4 / Xbox One); FIFA 18 (PC / PS4 / Switch / Xbox One); Madden NFL 18 (PS4 / Xbox One); NBA Live 18 (PS4 / Xbox One); Need for Speed Payback (PC / PS4 / Xbox One); Star Wars Battlefront II (PC / PS4 / Xbox One); A Way Out (PC / PS4 / Xbox One); Epic Games: Fortnite (PC / PS4 / Xbox One); Focus Home Interactive: Call of Cthulhu: The Official Video Game (PC / PS4 / Xbox One); Insurgency: Sandstorm (PS4); A Plague Tale: Innocence (PS4); Vampyr (PC / PS4 / Xbox One)	Fullbright: Tacoma (PC / Xbox One); Inti Creates: Bloodstained: Ritual of the Night (PC / PS4 / Switch / Vita / Xbox One); Kakao Games: Black Desert Online (PC / Xbox One); Kalypso Media: Tropico 6 (PC / PS4 / Xbox One); Konami: Metal Gear Survive (PC / PS4 / Xbox One); Pro Evolution Soccer 2018 (PC / PS3 / PS4 / Xbox 360 / Xbox One); Microsoft Studios: Crackdown 3 (PC / Xbox One); Forza Motorsport 7 (PC / Xbox One); Minecraft (PC / Switch / Xbox One / Android / iOS); Ori and the Will of the Wisps (PC / Xbox One); Sea of Thieves (PC / Xbox One); State of Decay 2 (PC / Xbox One); Natsume Inc.: Harvest Moon: Light of Hope (PC / Switch); Harvest Moon Lil' Farmers (Android / iOS / Kindle Fire); River City: Knights of Justice (3DS); Wild Guns Reloaded (PC); Nexon: LawBreakers (PC / PS4); Nicalis: Blade Strangers (PC / PS4 / Switch); Nintendo: Arms (Switch); Ever Oasis (3DS); Fire Emblem Warriors (New 3DS / Switch); Hey! Pikmin (3DS); Kirby Star Allies (Switch); The Legend of Zelda: Breath of the Wild DLC (Switch / Wii U); Mario & Luigi: Superstar Saga + Bowser's Minions (3DS); Metroid Prime 4 (Switch); Metroid: Samus Returns (3DS); Miitopia (3DS); Pokémon Sword and Shield (Switch); Pokkén Tournament DX (Switch); Splatoon 2 (Switch); Super Mario Odyssey (Switch); Sushi Striker: The Way of Sushido (3DS / Switch); Xenoblade Chronicles 2 (Switch); Yoshi's Crafted World (Switch); NIS America: Danganronpa V3: Killing Harmony (PC / PS4 / Vita); Ys VIII: Lacrimosa of Dana (PC / PS4 / Vita); Paradox Interactive: BattleTech (PC); Playful Corp.: Super Lucky's Tale (PC / Xbox One); Psyonix: Rocket League (PC / PS4 / Switch / Xbox One); Raw Fury: The Last Night (PC / Xbox One); Scavengers Studios: Darwin Project (PC / Xbox One); Sega: Sonic Forces (PC / PS4 / Switch / Xbox One); Sonic Mania (PC / PS4 / Switch / Xbox One); Total War: Arena (PC); Total War: Warhammer II (PC); Valkyria Revolution (PS4 / Vita / Xbox One); Yakuza 6 (PS4); Yakuza Kiwami (PS4)	Sony Interactive Entertainment: Bravo Team (PS4); Days Gone (PS4); Detroit: Become Human (PS4); God of War (PS4); Gran Turismo Sport (PS4); Hidden Agenda (PS4); Horizon Zero Dawn: The Frozen Wilds (PS4); Knack II (PS4); The Inpatient (PS4); Shadow of the Colossus remake (PS4); Spider-Man (PS4); Uncharted: The Lost Legacy (PS4); V! What Did I Do to Deserve This, My Lord? R (PS4); Square Enix: Dissidia Final Fantasy NT (PS4); Final Fantasy XII: The Zodiac Age (PS4); Final Fantasy XIV: Stormblood (PC / PS3 / PS4); Final Fantasy: Brave Exvius (Android / iOS); Flame vs. Blaze (Android / iOS); Kingdom Hearts III (PS4 / Xbox One); King's Knight: Wrath of the Dark Dragon (Android / iOS); Life Is Strange: Before the Storm (PC / PS4 / Xbox One); Lost Sphear (PC / PS4 / Switch); Mobius Final Fantasy (Android / iOS / PC); MotoGP '17 (PC / PS4 / Xbox One); MXGP3 (PC / PS4 / Xbox One); Monster of the Deep: Final Fantasy XV (PS4); StudioMDHR Entertainment: Cuphead (PC / Xbox One); Tommo: Bubsy: The Woolies Strike Back (PC / PS4); TaleWorlds Entertainment: Mount & Blade II: Bannerlord (PC); Toby Fox: Undertale (PS4 / Vita); Ubisoft: Assassin's Creed Origins (PC / PS4 / Xbox One); Beyond Good and Evil 2 (PC / PS4 / Xbox One); The Crew 2 (PC / PS4 / Xbox One); Far Cry 5 (PC / PS4 / Xbox One); Just Dance 2018 (PC / PS3 / PS4 / Switch / Wii / Wii U / Xbox 360 / Xbox One); Mario + Rabbids Kingdom Battle (Switch); Skull & Bones (PC / PS4 / Xbox One); South Park: The Fractured but Whole (PC / PS4 / Xbox One); South Park: Phone Destroyer (Android / iOS); Space Junkies (PC); Starlink: Battle for Atlas (PS4 / Switch / Xbox One); Steep: Road to the Olympics (PC / PS4 / Xbox One); Transference (PC / PS4 / Xbox One); Warner Bros. Interactive Entertainment: Cars 3: Driven to Win (PS3 / PS4 / Switch / Wii U / Xbox 360 / Xbox One); Injustice 2 (PS4 / Xbox One); Lego Dimensions (PS3 / PS4 / Wii U / Xbox 360 / Xbox One); Lego Marvel Super Heroes 2 (PC / PS4 / Switch / Xbox One); Lego Worlds (PC / PS4 / Switch / Xbox One); Middle-earth: Shadow of War (PC / PS4 / Xbox One); Whatnot Entertainment: Neil deGrasse Tyson Presents: Space Odyssey (Android / iOS / PC); Xseed Games: Fate/Extella: The Umbral Star (Switch); Sakuna: Of Rice and Ruin (PC / PS4); Senran Kagura: Peach Beach Splash (PS4); Shantae: Half-Genie Hero (Switch); Zwei: The Ilvard Insurrection (PC)

== Other events ==
=== E3 Coliseum ===
The E3 Coliseum took place from June 13–14, 2017 and held at The Novo near the convention center. This event featured panels and presentations from game developers and celebrities, designed to "take E3 attendees behind the scenes of E3's biggest new announcements", according to the ESA. The event was open to all E3 attendees though was aimed at consumer and business-oriented attendees rather than press, and some of the events during this was live streamed. Geoff Keighley arranged the event along with many of the staff from The Game Awards. Keighley said that the purpose of the Coliseum is "to give consumers a richer experience at E3", providing hands-on demos and panels that go into detail on recently released and newly presented games that are normally reserved for private press interviewers or meetings during the main E3 show. Among those companies attended at the E3 Coliseum included Activision, Bethesda Softworks, Gearbox Publishing, Microsoft Studios, Sony Interactive Entertainment, Square Enix, Ubisoft, and Warner Bros. Interactive Entertainment. Retrospectives on the Crash Bandicoot and Mortal Kombat series, as well as a review of the history of Bungie, was scheduled. The Coliseum also had panels by industry icons Hideo Kojima and Tim Schafer, along with others from outside the video game field including Jack Black, Neil deGrasse Tyson, Gennifer Hutchison, and Jordan Vogt-Roberts.

=== British Academy of Film and Television Arts ===
The British Academy of Film and Television Arts (BAFTA) held a special one-off ceremony during E3 in Los Angeles to award the founders of Riot Games, Brandon Beck and Marc Merrill, the BAFTA's Special Award for their "creative contribution to the games industry", particularly for their game League of Legends. The event by BAFTA was aimed to help expand their recognition of video games outside of the United Kingdom.

== Game Critics Awards ==
Following the event, judges from 38 gaming and media publications selected nominees and voted on awardees for the E3 Game Critics Awards, showcasing the best games presented during the event. The nominees were revealed on June 26, 2017, and winners named on June 28, 2017. The following table lists the winners and nominees for each category:

Award	Winner	Other Nominees
Best of Show	Super Mario Odyssey (Nintendo EPD/Nintendo)	Assassin's Creed Origins (Ubisoft Montreal/Ubisoft); Mario + Rabbids Kingdom Battle (Ubisoft Paris/Ubisoft Milan/Ubisoft); Middle-earth: Shadow of War (Monolith Productions/Warner Bros. Interactive Entertainment); Wolfenstein 2: The New Colossus (MachineGames/Bethesda Softworks)
Best Original Game	Mario + Rabbids Kingdom Battle (Ubisoft Paris/Ubisoft Milan/Ubisoft)	Detroit: Become Human (Quantic Dream/Sony Interactive Entertainment); Dragon Ball FighterZ (Arc System Works/Bandai Namco Entertainment); Sea of Thieves (Rare/Microsoft Studios); Skull & Bones (Ubisoft Singapore/Ubisoft)
Best Console Game	Super Mario Odyssey (Nintendo EPD/Nintendo)	Assassin's Creed Origins (Ubisoft Montreal/Ubisoft); Mario + Rabbids Kingdom Battle (Ubisoft Paris/Ubisoft Milan/Ubisoft); Middle-earth: Shadow of War (Monolith Productions/Warner Bros. Interactive Entertainment); Wolfenstein 2: The New Colossus (MachineGames/Bethesda Softworks)
Best PC Game	Destiny 2 (Bungie/Activision)	Middle-earth: Shadow of War (Monolith Productions/Warner Bros. Interactive Entertainment); Mount & Blade 2: Bannerlord (TaleWorlds Entertainment); Total War: Warhammer 2 (The Creative Assembly/Sega); Wolfenstein 2: The New Colossus (MachineGames/Bethesda Softworks)
Best VR Game	Lone Echo (Ready at Dawn/Oculus Studio)	Doom VFR (id Software/Bethesda Softworks); Fallout 4 VR (Bethesda Game Studios/Bethesda Softworks); Moss (Polyarc); Transference (SpectreVision/Ubisoft)
Best Mobile/Handheld	Metroid: Samus Returns (MercurySteam/Nintendo)	Durango (What Studio/Nexon); Hidden Agenda (Supermassive Games/Sony Interactive Entertainment); King's Knight: Wrath of the Dark Dragon (Square Enix); Shin Megami Tensei: Strange Journey Redux (Atlus)
Best Hardware	Xbox One X (Microsoft)	Astro A10 Gaming Headset (Astro); DisplayLink XR (DisplayLink); Razer Thresher Ultimate (Razer); Logitech PowerPlay Mat (Logitech)
Best Action Game	Wolfenstein 2: The New Colossus (MachineGames/Bethesda Softworks)	Call of Duty: WWII (Sledgehammer Games/Activision); Destiny 2 (Bungie/Activision); Far Cry 5 (Ubisoft Montreal/Ubisoft); Star Wars Battlefront 2 (EA DICE/Motive/Criterion/Electronic Arts)
Best Action/Adventure Game	Super Mario Odyssey (Nintendo EPD/Nintendo)	Assassin's Creed Origins (Ubisoft Montreal/Ubisoft); Detroit: Become Human (Quantic Dream/Sony Interactive Entertainment); Days Gone (SIE Bend Studio/Sony Interactive Entertainment); Middle-earth: Shadow of War (Monolith Productions/Warner Bros. Interactive Entertainment)
Best RPG	Ni No Kuni 2: Revenant Kingdom (Level-5/Bandai Namco Entertainment)	Battle Chasers: Nightwar (Airship Syndicate/THQ Nordic); Kingdom Come: Deliverance (Warhorse Studios/Deep Silver); Mount & Blade 2: Bannerlord (TaleWorlds Entertainment); South Park: The Fractured But Whole (Ubisoft San Francisco/South Park Digital Studios/Ubisoft); Vampyr (Dotnod Entertainment/Focus Home Interactive)
Best Fighting Game	Dragon Ball FighterZ (Arc System Works/Bandai Namco Entertainment)	Arms (Nintendo EPD/Nintendo); Marvel vs. Capcom: Infinite (Capcom); Pokkén Tournament DX (Bandai Namco Studios/The Pokemon Co.)
Best Racing Game	Forza Motorsport 7 (Turn 10 Studios/Microsoft Studios)	Gran Turismo Sport (Polyphony Digital/Sony Interactive Entertainment); Need for Speed Payback (Ghost Games/Electronic Arts); Project CARS 2 (Slightly Mad Studios/Bandai Namco Entertainment); The Crew 2 (Ivory Tower/Ubisoft Reflections/Ubisoft)
Best Sports Game	FIFA 18 (EA Vancouver/Electronic Arts)	Madden NFL 18 (EA Tiburon/Electronic Arts); Pro Evolution Soccer 2018 (PES Productions/Konami)
Best Strategy Game	Mario + Rabbids Kingdom Battle (Ubisoft Paris/Ubisoft Milan/Ubisoft)	Battletech (Harebrained Schemes/Paradox Interactive); Frostpunk (11 bit Studios); Total War: Arena (The Creative Assembly/Sega/Wargaming); Total War: Warhammer 2 (The Creative Assembly/Sega)
Best Family/Social Game	Hidden Agenda (Supermassive Games/Sony Interactive Entertainment)	DropMix (Harmonix/Hasbro); Just Dance 2018 (Ubisoft Paris/Ubisoft); Lego Marvel Super Heroes 2 (TT Games/Warner Bros. Interactive Entertainment); That's You (Wish Studios/Sony Interactive Entertainment)
Best Online Multiplayer	Star Wars Battlefront 2 (EA DICE/Motive/Criterion/Electronic Arts)	Call of Duty: WWII (Sledgehammer Games/Activision); Destiny 2 (Bungie/Activision); Sea of Thieves (Rare/Microsoft Studios); Skull & Bones (Ubisoft Singapore/Ubisoft)
Best Independent Game	The Artful Escape of Francis Vendetti (Beethoven & Dinosaur/Annapurna Interactive)	Ashen (Aurora 44/Annapurna Interactive); Bloodstained: Ritual of the Night (Inti Creates/505 Games); Donut County (Ben Esposito/Annapurna Interactive); Laser League (Roll7/505 Games)
