= The Mummy: The Animated Series (video game) =

2002 video game

The Mummy
- Developers: Asobo Studio (Windows, PS2); Ubi Soft Milan (GBA)
- Publishers: Hip Interactive (Windows, PS2); Ubi Soft (GBA)
- Designer: Massimo Guarini
- Platforms: Microsoft Windows, PlayStation 2, Game Boy Advance
- Release: Game Boy Advance: NA: November 20, 2002; PlayStation 2: EU: October 15, 2004
- Genre: Action-adventure
- Mode: Single-player

The Mummy: The Animated Series, also known as The Mummy: Manacle of Osiris or just The Mummy, is a 2002 action-adventure video game developed by Ubi Soft Milan and published by Ubi Soft for the Game Boy Advance, followed two years later by versions for Microsoft Windows and the PlayStation 2. The game is based on the Kids' WB animated television series of the same name.

== Development ==
In February 2002, it was announced that French video game publisher Ubi Soft had obtained the rights to publish and develop video games based on The Mummy: The Animated Series from Universal Studios Consumer Products Group, enabling the publisher to produce games based on the brand. Ubi Soft Milan developed the game for Game Boy Advance platform and was released in November.

HIP Interactive developed a new game based on The Mummy: The Animated Series for PlayStation 2 and PC, with the assistance of All In The Game LTD. Corey Johnson reprised his role as "Mr. Daniels" from the 1999 film The Mummy. According to casting director Phil Morris, Johnson was brought in to help reproduce the same production values of the original films and television show. The game was released in October 2004.

== Release ==
=== Promotion ===
HIP Interactive debuted the PlayStation 2 and PC version of the game at E3 which took place May 11–14, 2004. Russian gaming magazine GameLand ran a print advertisement for the PlayStation 2 version of the game in their November 2004 issue.

=== Reception ===
Reception

Aggregate score
| Aggregator | Score | | |
| Aggregator | GBA | PC | PS2 |
|---|---|---|---|
| Metacritic | 72/100 | N/A | N/A |

Review scores
| Publication | Score | | |
| Publication | GBA | PC | PS2 |
|---|---|---|---|
| GameSpot | 7.2/10 | N/A | N/A |
| Nintendo Power | 3.8/5 | N/A | N/A |

When the original Game Boy Advance version of the game was released by Ubisoft in November 2002, it received mostly positive reviews. GameSpot reviewed it and they claimed that the game lived up to expectations. Total Games UK ranked the game 89% out of 100%.
