= Virtual Viking – The Ambush =

2019 short film

- Directed by: Erik Gustavson
- Written by: Erik Gustavson; Samuel Pinney
- Produced by: Odd Arild Meling, Rasmus Ramstad
- Starring: Murray McArthur
- Music by: Peter Baden
- Production companies: Ridley Scott Associates; Dimension Studios; Hammerhead VR
- Release date: June 21, 2019 (The Viking Planet)
- Running time: 11 minutes
- Country: Norway
- Language: Old Norse

Virtual Viking – The Ambush is a 2019 short film directed by Erik Gustavson, using volumetric video capture to create one of the first films in virtual reality. Produced for The Viking Planet centre in Oslo, Norway, the film is part of a wider exhibition of the lives of Norse seafarers and uses a number of VR headsets to enable visitors to experience a Viking longship in the heat of battle.

== Plot ==
Skald recounts the story of how he was captured, in his youth, during an unsuccessful Viking raid.

== Cast ==
- Murray McArthur as Skald
- Luke White as Ulf
- Wolfie Hughes as Grim
- Christopher Rogers as Trym
- Ross O'Hennessy as Viking

== Awards and nominations ==
At the Aesthetica Short Film Festival 2019, Virtual Viking – The Ambush was awarded Best VR Film.
