= Anna Demetriou =

British actress

- Born: 13 July 1993 (age 33); United Kingdom
- Occupations: Actress; livestreamer
- Years active: 2018–present

Anna Demetriou (born 13 July 1993) is a British actress.

== Early life ==
Anna Demetriou was born on 13 July 1993. She has Greek-Cypriot ancestry through one of her parents. She was raised in Cheshire, where she lived in Backford and attended Upton-by-Chester High School. She later trained in acting at the London Academy of Music and Dramatic Art (LAMDA).

== Career ==
Demetriou began acting onstage in Chester with the Forum Studio Theatre, the Grosvenor Park Young Theatre Company, and the B-It Theatre Company, occasionally directing at the latter. After graduating from LAMDA, she made her film debut as the Princess Helle of Volsung in Viking Destiny (2018). She then played Katrina Rodriguez in The Marine 6: Close Quarters (2018). She later began voice acting and has since voiced characters in video games such as Horizon Forbidden West (2022), A Plague Tale: Requiem (2022), Final Fantasy XVI (2023), Baldur's Gate 3 (2023), and Fallout: London (2024). She also livestreams on Twitch.

== Filmography ==
=== Film ===
Year	Title	Role	Ref.
2018	Viking Destiny	Princess Helle of Volsung	
2018	The Marine 6: Close Quarters	Katrina Rodriguez	

=== Video games ===
Year	Title	Role	Notes	Ref.
2018	Bravo Team	Glinda	Voice	
2019	Once Upon a Crime in the West	Bo	Voice	
2019–2021	Star Citizen	New Babbage Assistant / SAIC Rowena Dulli	Voice and motion capture	
2022	Horizon Forbidden West	Additional Voices	Voice	
2022	A Plague Tale: Requiem	Sophia	Voice	
2023	Final Fantasy XVI	Dorys	Voice	
2023	Baldur's Gate 3	Mirie	Voice	
2024	Fallout: London	Apache Alice / Elizabeth Summer / Additional Voices	Voice	
2026	Resonance: A Plague Tale Legacy	Sophia	Voice and motion capture	
