= Murray McArthur =

British actor

- Born: 4 May 1966 (age 60); Honiton, Devon, England
- Education: Drama Studio London
- Occupation: Actor
- Years active: 1993–present
- Spouse: Geraldine
- Children: 2

Murray McArthur (born 4 May 1966) is an English actor.

== Early life ==
McArthur was born and brought up in Devon. The son of a mushroom farmer, of Scottish parentage and red-haired, he often plays Scottish roles. He attended King's School, Ottery St Mary, received a BA (Joint Hons) degree in English and Drama at Loughborough University and went on to study acting at the Drama Studio London. He was a member of the Devon County Youth Theatre.

== Career ==
He has appeared in many stage-plays in British regional theatres and on London's West End (including the Royal National Theatre and Shakespeare's Globe). Much of his stage work has taken him overseas (Ahmanson Theatre, Los Angeles & Panasonic Globe Theatre, Tokyo). His performance as Joe Gargery in Great Expectations at the Gate Theatre, Dublin was described by Irish Independent critic Bruce Arnold: "Emphasis on the heart-warming relationship between Pip and Joe Gargery is a crucial part of the story, and the blacksmith, played by Murray McArthur in the best performance of the evening, achieves this".

Murray appeared as Hasten, the Viking who breaks the Doctor's sonic sunglasses, in episode The Girl Who Died of Doctor Who.

He also portrayed a Wildling chieftain in the fifth season episode Hardhome of the HBO series Game of Thrones. His character returned in the sixth season episode The Broken Man with the character name Dim Dalba. He speaks for the Wildlings of The Gift when asked by Jon Snow (character), Tormund Giantsbane, Sansa Stark and Davos Seaworth to join them in the battle against the forces of Ramsay Bolton.

Recently played Hákon Iron-Beard in Robert Eggers Viking revenge film The Northman, released in April 2022. Production on the film was halted due to the COVID-19 pandemic, resumed in August 2020 and finally completed in early December 2020.

In 2021 McArthur was cast as 'Dad' in the British psychological thriller Marooned Awakening. Principal photography took place in September 2021 on the island of Guernsey. The feature film premiered at the Beau Séjour Theatre on Guernsey on 3 September 2022 and will be released in the United States and Canada on streaming services on February 21, 2023.

Murray plays the part of Fabian, a homeless man who lives in the ruins of the original pilgrim meeting house, in Tim Burton's recently released Wednesday on Netflix, where Jenna Ortega's Wednesday Addams sets Thing on him. Later on he is killed by a monster and winds up in the Jericho Morgue where Wednesday notices his missing foot.

In 2026, Murray appeared as 'Patrick' in the British horror short A Hand to Hold, which was selected for the 41st Santa Barbara International Film Festival and the 2026 FrightFest in Glasgow.

== Personal life ==
Married to Geraldine with two children, Orla and Freya, he lives in South East London.

== Filmography ==
=== Film ===
Year	Film	Role	Director	Producer
2001	Endgame	Det. Const. Kenny	Gary Wicks	Various Films Ltd
2005	Finding Neverland	Stagehand	Marc Forster	Miramax
2005	Keeping Mum	Vicar's Convention Master of Ceremonies	Niall Johnson	Summit Entertainment
2007	The Last Legion	Tertius	Doug Lefler	Dino De Laurentiis Company
2008	Made of Honor	Donald	Paul Weiland	Columbia Pictures
2009	A Congregation of Ghosts	George Tredinnick	Mark Collicott	Whitechapel Films
2018	A Midsummer Night's Dream	Snug (A Midsummer Night's Dream)	Sacha Bennett	Parkhouse Pictures
2018	Viking Destiny	Loki	David L.G. Hughes	Fatal Black
2019	Virtual Viking - The Ambush	Skald	Erik Gustavson	Ridley Scott Associates
2022	The Northman	Hákon Iron-Beard	Robert Eggers	New Regency
2022	Marooned Awakening	Dad	Musaab Mustafa	Across the Channel Productions Ltd
2023	Wonka	Ship's Captain	Paul King	Warner Bros.
2023	Seize Them!	Ur-Nammu	Curtis Vowell	Entertainment Film Distributors
2025	How to Train Your Dragon	Hoark the Haggard	Dean DeBlois	Universal Pictures

=== Television ===
Year	Series	Episode	Role	Director	Producer
1994	EastEnders	Episode 950	P.C. Baines	Jo Johnson	BBC
1994	Stanley's Dragon	TV movie	Soldier	Gerry Poulson	Granada Television
1995	The Famous Five	Five Fall into Adventure	Red Tower	Michael Kerrigan	Tyne Tees Television & Zenith North
1996	Tales from the Crypt	Escape	George Heathcote	Peter MacDonald (director)	HBO
1996	Black Hearts in Battersea	TV series	Boatswain Morgan	David Bell	BBC
1997	Aquila	The Eagle Has Landed	Policeman	David Bell	BBC
1998	Human Bomb	TV movie	Kessler	Anthony Page	Griffin
1999	Taggart	Bloodlines	Alan Buchanan	Alan Macmillan	STV Productions
2000	Heartbeat	The Fool on the Hill	Charlie Osborne	Paul Walker	Yorkshire Television
2000	Burnside	Exposed: Parts 1 & 2	DC McVeagh	Bruce MacDonald	Thames Television
2002	Falling Apart	TV movie	Gareth	Brian Hill (director)	Century Films
2006	The Complete Guide to Parenting	Episode #1.1	Mr. Franklin	Mandie Fletcher	Talkback Thames
2006	Doctors	A Very Important Date	Al Burgess	Fred Aidroos	BBC
2006	Friends and Crocodiles	TV movie	Soup Man 1	Stephen Poliakoff	BBC
2006	Foyle's War	The French Drop	Private Knox	Gavin Millar	ITV
2007	Murphy's Law	Episode #5.2	Terry Westgate	Colm McCarthy (director)	Tiger Aspect Productions
2007	The Bill	Assault on Sun Hill	Sgt. Michael Brindley	Darcia Martin	Talkback Thames
2008	John Adams	Unite or Die	The Magistrate	Tom Hooper	HBO
2008	Lark Rise to Candleford	Episode #1.2	Bailiff Griggs	Charles Palmer (director)	BBC
2008	Summerhill	TV movie	Fire Officer Sibton	Jon East	Tiger Aspect Productions
2009	Casualty	Palimpsest	Roy Hyde	Alan Grint	BBC
2015	Doctor Who	The Girl Who Died	Hasten	Edward Bazalgette	BBC
2015	Game of Thrones	Hardhome	Dim Dalba	Miguel Sapochnik	HBO
2016	Barbarians Rising	Revenge	Egus	Simon George	History Channel
2016	Game of Thrones	The Broken Man	Dim Dalba	Mark Mylod	HBO
2017	Outlander	All Debts Paid	Duncan Kerr	Brendan Maher	Starz
2018	Doctors	A Safe Place	Barney Rutger	Paul Gibson	BBC
2018	Watership Down (miniseries)	Episodes 2-4	Farmer	Noam Murro	BBC & Netflix
2019	Pitching In	Episodes 2-3	Sir Henry	Noreen Kershaw	BBC Cymru Wales & LA Productions
2022	Wednesday	Friend or Woe & Woe What a Night	Fabian	Tim Burton	MGM & Netflix
2023	The Change	Episode 6	Brian	Al Campbell	Channel 4

== Stage ==
Year	Play	Role	Director	Producer
1993	On The Piste	Chris Baxter	Neil Sissons	Hull Truck Theatre
1994	A Midsummer Night's Dream	Lysander	Philip Joseph	National Theatre Studios
1995	Great Expectations	Bentley Drummle	John Durnin	Northcott Theatre
1995	Abigail's Party	Tony	Tim Carroll	Northcott Theatre
1996	The Grapes of Wrath (play)	Noah Joad	John Durnin	Northcott Theatre
1996	A Doll's House		Anthony Page	Thelma Holt & Playhouse Theatre
1997	An Enemy of the People	Engstrand	Sir Trevor Nunn	Olivier Theatre, Royal National Theatre & Ahmanson Theatre
1997	Peter Pan	Great Big Little Panther	John Caird (director)	Olivier Theatre, Royal National Theatre
2002	King Lear		Barry Kyle	Shakespeare's Globe & Panasonic Globe Theatre
2008	Great Expectations	Joe Gargery	Alan Stanford	Gate Theatre
