= The Crew Motorfest =

2023 video game

- Standard Edition cover art (Note: The cover depicted the Toyota Supra (A80) and the Lamborghini Revuelto on the foreground, with the Ford Bronco doing airbourne on the background.)
- Developers: Ubisoft Ivory Tower (Note: Additional work done by Ubisoft Barcelona, Ubisoft Belgrade, Ubisoft Bucharest, Ubisoft Kyiv, Ubisoft Montpellier, Ubisoft Odesa, Ubisoft Pune, Ubisoft Reflections, Ubisoft Shanghai, and Ubisoft Toronto.)
- Publisher: Ubisoft
- Director: Stéphane Beley
- Producer: Grégory Corgié
- Composers: Blue Stahli; Dirty Two Club; Ribongia
- Platforms: Nintendo Switch 2; PlayStation 4; PlayStation 5; Windows; Xbox One; Xbox Series X/S
- Release: PS4, PS5, Windows, Xbox One, Series X/S; September 14, 2023; Nintendo Switch 2; October 8, 2026
- Genre: Racing
- Modes: Single-player, multiplayer

The Crew Motorfest is a 2023 racing video game developed by Ubisoft Ivory Tower and published by Ubisoft for the PlayStation 4, PlayStation 5, Windows, Xbox One, and Xbox Series X/S. It is the sequel to 2018's The Crew 2 and the third game in The Crew series, and was released on September 14, 2023, with the Nintendo Switch 2 version released on October 8, 2026. The game is set in an open world environment; scaled-down and fictionalized versions of the Hawaiian Islands of Oʻahu, Maui, Kahoʻolawe, Kauaʻi, and Niʻihau. It has received generally positive reviews from critics.

== Gameplay ==
The Crew Motorfest is set in a scaled-down version of (as of October 2026) seven of the eight main islands of Hawaii; initially launched with only Oʻahu, later updates added Maui, Kahoʻolawe, Kauaʻi, and Niʻihau, with Molokaʻi and Lānaʻi as the host islands for the game's level editor called TrackForge. It is themed around a festival that serves as the main area for accessing the various events in the game, which is similar to that of the Forza Horizon series of games. Its gameplay is similar to that of the previous games in the series, featuring online multiplayer features referred to in game as a "crew", as well as being able to control vehicles other than cars such as planes and boats.

The main part of the game is "Playlists", which consist of a series of staged events, side activities, and challenges. As of October 2026, there are 34 playlists, each with a different theme such as vintage cars, RC cars, Lamborghini, Porsche 911, Ferrari, BMW, and NASCAR, alongside collaborations with influencers and lifestyle brands such as Supercar Blondie, Liberty Walk, Donut Media, and Red Bull.

Multiplayer modes include the "Grand Race" and "Demolition Royale". The Grand Race a long race that is approximately 10 minutes long with 28 players online split up into three sections for three tiers of racing. The sections and tiers for each race is chosen by random and swaps every 30 minutes, while the race route is random for every race. Demolition Royale is the game's demolition derby-based battle royale mode, where up to 32 players are put into crews with the main goal of driving their demolition-type vehicles to destroy the racers of other crews in a shrinking safe area. Power-ups spawn in the safe area to give racers an advantage, such as shields and health. The Demolition Royale ends when only one crew still has at least one racer remaining.

The Main Stage, the game's live-service mode, consists of a monthly theme with unique limited-time rewards. Each week of each month, players earn experience to fill up the Revisit, Compete, and Explore timelines to earn rewards. After filing up one of the Main Stage timelines, the player unlocks the "Legend" timeline, filled with its own set of limited-time rewards.

Every week, a sub-theme of the main stage theme will be used for the "Summit Contest" (previously called "Summit Clash"), a weekly themed contest where players compete in nine challenges—six races and three feats—to earn points for a tiered ranking of Bronze, Silver, Gold, and Platinum.

Like its two predecessors, The Crew Motorfest requires a constant internet connection to play, but on September 12, 2024, Ubisoft announced that Motorfest will be getting an offline mode, following a major controversy from gamers and critics over the shutdown and license revocation of the first game.

== Development and release ==
The Crew Motorfest was developed by Ubisoft Ivory Tower. It started as a DLC expansion for The Crew 2, although that changed when several ideas for changes in progression structure weren't compatible with the current game engine.

It was internally known as Project Orlando during development until October 2022 when the title and setting of the game were leaked. Before the Motorfest name was decided, it was tentatively entitled The Crew Motorcamp.

It was announced with a teaser trailer released on January 31, 2023. A closed testing period for Motorfest on PC began on February 1, 2023, with testing for consoles coming at a later date. The game was released on September 14, 2023 for PlayStation 4, PlayStation 5, Windows, Xbox One, and Xbox Series X/S. Journalists noted the similarities between Motorfest and the first two Test Drive Unlimited games (2006 and 2011), which several developers from Ivory Tower worked on previously and also share Oʻahu as a main setting.

=== Post-release ===
During the 2024 Ubisoft Forward which was held on June 10, Ubisoft announced that The Crew Motorfest would include another Hawaiian island, Maui, along with "The Chase Squad" content. It became available on November 6, 2024 as part of the Year 2 plan.

A level editor feature called TrackForge, was added into the game in March 2026. According to the game's current creative director Julien Hummer, the team consulted TrackMania developers when creating the editor. During the first week of the update, over 30,000 user-made tracks were created.

On July 8, 2026, Ubisoft announced that they were releasing the game for the Nintendo Switch 2 on October 8.

== Reception ==
Reception

Aggregate scores
| Aggregator | Score |
|---|---|
| Metacritic | PC: 76/100; PS5: 76/100; XSX/S: 75/100 |
| OpenCritic | 62% |

Review score
| Publication | Score |
|---|---|
| Famitsu | 35/40 |

Edit on Wikidata

According to review aggregator website Metacritic, The Crew Motorfest received generally favorable reviews from critics. In Japan, four critics from Famitsu gave the game a total score of 35 out of 40. The game was nominated for "Best Sports/Racing Game" at The Game Awards 2023.

It debuted as the second best-selling game of the week in the United Kingdom. It also became the fastest-selling entry in the series.
