= Racket Sports Party =

2010 video game

- Developer(s): Asobo Studio
- Publisher(s): Ubisoft
- Platform(s): Wii, PlayStation 3 (PlayStation Move)
- Release: Wii: NA: March 9, 2010; AU: March 25, 2010; EU: March 26, 2010; PlayStation 3: EU: September 15, 2010; AU: September 16, 2010; NA/UK: September 17, 2010
- Genre(s): Sports (Tennis)
- Mode(s): Single-player, multiplayer

Racket Sports Party, known in North America as Racquet Sports, is a sports video game developed by Asobo Studio and published by Ubisoft for Wii and PlayStation 3's PlayStation Move (the latter under the name Racket Sports in the PAL region) in 2010.

== Reception ==
Reception

Aggregate score
Aggregator	Score	
Aggregator	PS3	Wii
Metacritic	45/100	51/100

Review scores
Publication	Score	
Publication	PS3	Wii
Eurogamer	4/10	N/A
Famitsu	24/40	N/A
GameSpot	4/10	N/A
IGN	4.5/10	N/A
Jeuxvideo.com	8/20	7/20
Joystiq	4/5	N/A
Nintendo Power	N/A	6.5/10
Nintendo World Report	N/A	4/10
PlayStation: The Official Magazine	6/10	N/A
Push Square	3/10	N/A
The Guardian	2/5	N/A

The Wii version received "mixed" reviews, while the PlayStation 3 version received "generally unfavorable reviews" according to the review aggregation website Metacritic. In Japan, where the PS3 version was ported for release under the name Racquet Sports (ラケットスポーツ, Raketto Supōtsu) on February 24, 2011, Famitsu gave it a score of all four sixes for a total of 24 out of 40.
