= WALL-E (video game) =

2008 movie video game

WALL•E
- Developers: Heavy Iron Studios (PS3/X360/Wii); Asobo Studio (PS2/PSP/PC); Helixe (DS); Savage Entertainment (PSP)
- Publisher: THQ
- Director: Gregory Ecklund
- Producer: Diana Wu
- Designers: Scott Compton; Earl Berkeley
- Programmer: Jose Villeta
- Artists: Jeffrey Berting; Dorothy Chen
- Composer: Bruno Coon
- Platforms: macOS; Microsoft Windows; PlayStation 2 PlayStation 3 PlayStation Portable; Nintendo DS; Wii; Xbox 360
- Release: NA: June 24, 2008; EU: July 4, 2008; AU: September 4, 2008; JP: December 11, 2008 (PS3, Wii, DS)
- Genre: Platform/Puzzle
- Modes: Single-player, multiplayer

WALL-E (stylized as WALL·E) is a platform video game developed by three studios; Heavy Iron Studios, Asobo Studio and Helixe, all responsible for different platforms, and all published by THQ. The games are based on a slightly earlier version of the 2008 film of the same name, so some key scenes do not match up with the film release. The game received mixed reviews, however the version of the game developed by Asobo Studio was received more positively.

== Gameplay ==
The PlayStation 3, Wii and Xbox 360 versions feature nine explorable levels. The Microsoft Windows, Mac OS X, PlayStation 2 and PlayStation Portable versions feature twenty-four levels, and the Nintendo DS features fourteen explorable worlds. The Wii is the only version of the game that features 3 head-to-head multiplayer modes, while the Nintendo DS version features co-op modes playable as WALL-E or EVE. As the player plays through the levels of the Nintendo DS version, they unlock clips from the movie viewable at any time. The Microsoft Windows, Mac OS X, PlayStation 2 and PlayStation Portable versions allow the player to use music to summon reject bots throughout the game. The story mode is based on an earlier version of the film with some creative liberties also taken, as the character's roles are different from the movie. GO-4 survives and tries to steal the plant when the Axiom lands on Earth, EVE is tasered by AUTO, WALL-E repairing EVE (EVE tries to repair WALL-E in the original) and WALL-E survives from getting crushed by the Holo-Detector. The reversal of EVE and WALL-E being damaged was actually intended to occur in the movie, but was later changed.

== Plot ==
The video game closely follows the same plot as the film. In 2805, Earth is covered in garbage and abandoned, while people are evacuated by mega-corporation Buy N Large on giant star-liners. BnL has left behind WALL-E robot trash compactors to clean up the mess, but they all eventually stopped functioning, except one unit, which has gained sentience. One day, WALL-E discovers a plant in a refrigerator and comes across an uncrewed spaceship that deploys an EVE probe to scan the planet for life, with little success. WALL-E is infatuated with EVE, who is initially hostile after she almost shoots him, but immediately befriends him. As a sandstorm sweeps across the city, WALL-E and EVE make their way through the storm, where they must defeat a malfunctioning WALL-A along the way. After reaching WALL-E's truck, he shows her many of his things, along with the plant. She suddenly takes the plant and goes into standby mode, leaving WALL-E wondering why she shut down, and he leaves her on the truck's roof. The ship then returns to collect EVE, and WALL-E races towards it and hitches a ride as it returns to its mothership, the starliner Axiom.

While avoiding M-O, WALL-E follows the cart carrying EVE to Captain McCrea's headquarters. McCrea is excited by the discovery, as they can finally go home, but is shocked to discover that the plant is gone. He believes EVE is broken and orders AUTO to send her to a repair ward along with WALL-E for cleaning.

Upon arriving at the repair ward, WALL-E believes that EVE is being hurt, but is separated from her before he can reach her. WALL-E obtains EVE's plasma cannon and uses it to fight off security robots and free some of the malfunctioning robots to help him. He manages to find EVE just as she is finished with her checkup and takes back her plasma cannon. They then head to an escape pod to return to Earth, but EVE cannot abandon her directive. They are interrupted when GO-4 arrives with the plant, placing it in the pod that WALL-E is in and sets to self-destruct. After it is jettisoned, WALL-E escapes with the plant as the pod explodes, using a fire extinguisher as a rocket booster that goes out of control. EVE follows him across space and through the ship until his fire extinguisher runs out of water. EVE retrieves the plant, puts WALL-E back in the Axiom, and heads to the Captain's quarters.

Captain McCrea, now happy to see the plant, realizes that they can return to Earth. However, AUTO refuses to let this happen, revealing his own secret no-return directive that falsely claimed that the cleanup on Earth was unsuccessful. He mutinies and electrocutes EVE, throwing her along with the plant down the garbage chute. WALL-E hears EVE and he follows her down the garbage chute, with M-O still in pursuit. After repairing EVE, WALL-E and her, along with M-O, head back up to the deck where they and the malfunctioning robots fight off security robots sent by AUTO. The Captain fights AUTO and manages to open the Holo-Detector chamber. AUTO tilts the ship sideways and tries to close the chamber. WALL-E heads to the chamber and struggles to keep it open. Captain McCrea manages to disable AUTO and straighten the ship while EVE inserts the plant to activate the hyperjump, freeing a damaged WALL-E.

Having arrived back on Earth, EVE repairs and reactivates WALL-E, but finds that his memory has been reset and his personality is gone. Heartbroken, EVE gives WALL-E a farewell kiss, which sparks his memory back to life and restores his original personality. WALL-E and EVE reunite as the humans and robots of the Axiom begin to restore Earth and its environment.

== Development ==
=== Middle East release ===
Publisher THQ, in collaboration with the Emirati company Pluto Games, released a localized edition of WALL-E in the Middle East, making the game the first Western video game to be officially translated into Arabic. This was done as a strategy to appeal to the local gamers in their mother tongue, and commit to releasing more localized games in the region in future. The Arabic translated edition is available on the PlayStation 3, PlayStation Portable and Xbox 360, even though WALL-E in general is still available on all other platforms. The Arabic translated edition of the game was released on June 27, 2008.

== Reception ==
Reception

Aggregate score
Aggregator	Score						
Aggregator	DS	PC	PS2	PS3	PSP	Wii	Xbox 360
Metacritic	54/100	58/100	67/100	51/100	64/100	51/100	50/100

Review scores
Publication	Score						
Publication	DS	PC	PS2	PS3	PSP	Wii	Xbox 360
Eurogamer							3/10
Game Informer							4/10
GameSpot	3.5/10		7.5/10	6/10		6/10	6/10
GameZone	6.7/10		7.2/10	5/10	5/10	5.5/10	6.3/10
IGN	7/10	7.5/10	7.5/10	4.5/10	7.3/10	4/10	4.5/10
Official Xbox Magazine (US)							6/10
PALGN				7/10			

All versions of the game were met with average reviews. Reviewing the Xbox 360 version, IGN concluded that rather than buying the game, "this may be an instance where you wait for the DVD, or go see the movie again instead". As of July 30, 2008, the game has sold over one million copies. The PlayStation 2 version was nominated as one of the "Most Surprisingly Good Game" and "Best Use of a Creative License" by GameSpot's "Best of 2008" awards, but did not win either.
