= Super Farm =

2003 multiplayer party video game

- Developer: Asobo Studio
- Publisher: Ignition Entertainment
- Composer: Frédéric Motte
- Platform: PlayStation 2
- Release: PlayStation 2: EU: February 2004
- Genres: Party, Platformer
- Modes: Single-player, Multiplayer

Super Farm is a party video game with a farmyard theme developed by Asobo Studio and published by Ignition Entertainment for the PlayStation 2. Originally developed by Kalisto Entertainment, the developers of the game purchased the rights for the game after the company's dissolution and founded Asobo Studio. An Xbox and PC version was planned but never released.

== Story ==
The game centers on Pamela, a blonde-haired prize turkey-hen who is taken from the farm to be sold at the local meat factory, prompting a chase to rescue her.

== Gameplay ==
Up to four players can compete in cooperative and team-based play. The game features six game types, a range of weaponry and items, 16 locations, and four hidden bonus levels.

The game includes four named modes: Collect Mode has players competing to gather items to return to Pamela; Baja Mode consists of checkpoint races; Keep It Mode tasks players with holding Pamela's handkerchief for as long as possible; and Frag Mode consists of players knocking out and collecting as many of their competitors' teeth as possible.
