= The Crew 2 =

2018 racing video game

- Initial release and retail cover art (Note: The art features the Zivko Edge 540 (top), the Jaguar Vector V-40R Powerboat (upper left), the KTM 450 EXC (lower left), the 2017 Chevrolet Camaro ZL1 (center), the fictitious Proto Buggy (upper right), and the 2017 Harley-Davidson Iron 883 (lower right).)
- Developers: Ubisoft Ivory Tower (Note: Additional work done by Asobo Studio, Ubisoft Montpellier, Ubisoft Belgrade, and Ubisoft Shanghai.)
- Publisher: Ubisoft
- Director: Stéphane Beley
- Producers: Olivier Gueydon; Yann Le Guyader; Stéphane Jankowski
- Designer: Boris Mellet
- Programmer: Didier Blanche
- Artist: David Guillaume
- Composers: Steve Ouimette; ill Factor
- Platforms: PlayStation 4; Windows; Xbox One; Google Stadia
- Release: PlayStation 4, Windows, Xbox One; June 29, 2018; Stadia; March 25, 2020
- Genre: Racing
- Modes: Single-player, multiplayer

The Crew 2 is a 2018 racing video game developed by Ubisoft Ivory Tower and published by Ubisoft for PlayStation 4, Windows, Xbox One, and Google Stadia. It is the sequel to 2014's The Crew. It features a persistent open world environment for free-roaming across a scaled-down recreation of the contiguous United States. The game allows players to control a variety of vehicles including cars, motorcycles, boats, and airplanes.

A sequel, The Crew Motorfest, was released on September 14, 2023.

== Gameplay ==
In The Crew 2, players can explore the game's open world by piloting a plane.

Similar to its predecessor, The Crew 2 is a racing game. In the game, players assume control of a racer who is trying to work their way to become successful in multiple vehicular racing disciplines. It features a persistent open world environment for racing and free-roaming across a scaled-down recreation of the contiguous United States. In addition to cars, players can control other kinds of vehicles, including airplanes, motorcycles, and powerboats. Each vehicle has its own control physics, meaning that game play is different when players are controlling different types of vehicles. Players can switch between controlling air, land and sea vehicles instantly.

The game features four different hub worlds, with each having their own theme and playstyle. These themes include off-road, street racing, pro racing, and free-style. Similar to the first game, it places an emphasis on playing multiplayer in groups called crews. It also features a cooperative multiplayer mode, which allows players to join any events besides "boss" events together. This mode can also be played solo with artificial intelligence.

== Synopsis ==
The game features a nonlinear story that follows the unnamed player character as they become a racing icon in the United States by winning in all racing disciplines available in the game. There are four disciplines: Street Racing, Off-road, Freestyle, and Pro Racing. In Street Racing, the player is assisted by Latrell Jordan. In Off-road, the player is assisted by Tucker "Tuck" Morgan, having previously been assisted by Wade Palmer until the player complete "The Switch" event. In Freestyle, the player is assisted by Sofia Valentina Herrera and Emmett Lee Parker. In Pro Racing, the player is assisted by Alexis Kendrick.

== Development ==
The Crew 2 was developed by Ubisoft Ivory Tower. Parts of the development was based on the feedback they received on the previous installment. One major critique was that players did not have enough freedom to explore the world and do missions. To solve the problem, Ubisoft overhauled the game's progression system and decided not to focus much on the game's narrative, which would require players to complete missions in a very specific order, and instead divided the game into several hub worlds, with each representing a unique driving style. Players can stay in these hubs to play the missions that interest them and do not need to force themselves to visit other hubs to play through missions that do not interest them. The Crew's downloadable content, Wild Run, which was positively reviewed by players, also prompted the studio to focus more on developing content regarding off-road racing.

As the game features a variety of vehicles, Ivory Tower also needed to improve the game's graphics. According to the game's producer, Stephane Jankowski, these new types of vehicles allow players to explore the open world with new perspectives. For instance, flying a plane means that players can see objects that are very far away. As a result, the engine had to be modified to significantly improve the game's draw distance. The engine was also updated to include other enhancements, such as atmospheric clouds and realistic vegetation. The game's control was designed to be accessible but "hard to master".

The game was announced in May 2017 during Ubisoft's earning's call. It was revealed at E3 2017 accompanied with a cinematic trailer and gameplay demonstrations. The game was originally set to be released for PlayStation 4, Windows, and Xbox One on March 16, 2018, however, in early December 2017 Ubisoft announced that the game was postponed towards mid- or late-2018, in order to give developers more time to deliver a quality product. A closed alpha for PC was held from 14 to 19 of March 2018 and a closed beta was held from 31 of May to 4 of June of the same year. The game was released worldwide on June 29, 2018.

=== Post-release ===
As with the previous title in the series, The Crew 2 initially required a constant internet connection to play; however in 2024, following a major controversy from gamers and critics over the shutdown and license revocation of the first game, Ubisoft announced an update introducing offline play, which was released on October 16, 2025. The offline mode continued receiving updates as of April 2026.

== Marketing ==
To entice The Crew players to return for The Crew 2, Ubisoft implemented a reward program, which allowed players to unlock up to 18 cars by achieving certain milestones in The Crew before The Crew 2 was released. Furthermore, all returning players from The Crew automatically received the 2014 Ferrari 458 Speciale upon the game's release. Also, the publisher announced the touring car version of the 2017 Mercedes-AMG C 63 and the 2017 Harley-Davidson Iron 883 as pre-order bonuses, whereas players ordering the Deluxe or Gold edition receive further vehicles, with the Gold edition also including the season pass. In addition to the reward system, Ubisoft also held a closed beta for players who signed up, as well as an open beta that occurred on June 21 until June 24. Those who participated in the open beta received a gold helmet in the full version of the game. Ubisoft also plans to have a "King of the Road Trip" competition, where popular YouTubers and streamers will get a chance to compete in a competition, where the players race against other players that are in the same region as them.

== Reception ==
Reception

Aggregate score
Aggregator	Score
Metacritic	(PC) 66/100 (PS4) 64/100 (XONE) 69/100

Review scores
Publication	Score
Destructoid	7/10
Electronic Gaming Monthly	6.5/10
Game Informer	6/10
GameSpot	8/10
GamesRadar+	3.5/5
IGN	7/10

The Crew 2 received "mixed or average reviews" according to review aggregator website Metacritic.

=== Awards ===
Year	Award	Category	Result	Ref.
2017	Game Critics Awards	Best Racing Game	Nominated	
2018	Game Critics Awards	Best Racing Game	Nominated	
2018	Ping Awards	Best Graphics	Nominated	
2018	Ping Awards	Best Sports Game	Won	
2019	National Academy of Video Game Trade Reviewers Awards	Game, Franchise Racing	Nominated	

== Sequel ==
On January 31, 2023, Ubisoft announced the next installment in The Crew series, titled The Crew Motorfest. Set in a scaled-down recreation of the islands of Oʻahu, Maui, and Kauaʻi in Hawaii, the game was released on September 14, 2023, for PlayStation 4, PlayStation 5, Windows, Xbox One, and Xbox Series X/S.
