= The Crew (video game) =

2014 racing video game

- Original cover art
- Developers: Ubisoft Ivory Tower; Ubisoft Reflections (Note: The Xbox 360 port was developed by Asobo Studio and Ubisoft Shanghai.)
- Publisher: Ubisoft
- Director: Stéphane Beley
- Producers: Richard Blenkinsop; Cristian Pana
- Artists: Benoit Boucher; David Guillaume; Jean-Luc Damieux-Verdeau
- Composer: Joseph Trapanese
- Engine: Dunia
- Platforms: PlayStation 4; Windows; Xbox 360; Xbox One
- Release: December 2, 2014
- Genre: Racing
- Modes: Single-player, multiplayer

The Crew is a discontinued 2014 French-British online-only racing video game co-developed by Ubisoft Ivory Tower and Ubisoft Reflections and published by Ubisoft. The game was released for PlayStation 4, Windows, and Xbox One, with an Xbox 360 port developed by Asobo Studio in December 2014. It featured a persistent open world environment for free-roaming across a scaled-down recreation of the contiguous United States and included both role-playing and large-scale multiplayer elements.

Upon release, The Crew received mixed reviews from critics who praised the game's world design but criticized the always-online aspect, which created technical glitches and other issues, the difficult-to-understand user interface, and the presence of microtransactions. The game shipped two million units by January 1, 2015.

The first expansion, titled The Crew: Wild Run, was released on November 17, 2015. The second expansion, entitled The Crew: Calling All Units, was announced at Gamescom 2016 and released on November 29, 2016. The Crew was later followed by two sequels, The Crew 2 in 2018 and The Crew Motorfest in 2023.

Ubisoft decided not to add an offline singleplayer mode for the game and permanently shut down the game's servers in 2024, citing "upcoming server infrastructure" and "licensing constraints", rendering it unplayable, as no server software or offline mode had been publicly released. Ubisoft additionally revoked the game license from those who owned the game on Ubisoft Connect. A significant controversy arose around the game's shutdown, including a class-action lawsuit, and the launch of the Stop Killing Games campaign to prevent game publishers from using similar practices to render purchased games unplayable. The campaign includes a European Citizens' Initiative, which earned 1,294,188 verified signatures, as well as a UK Parliament petition, which earned 189,890 signatures in total.

A community project named "The Crew Unlimited" released a server emulator to make the PC version of the game playable without Ubisoft servers, on September 15, 2025.

== Gameplay ==
The Crew is a racing game set in a persistent open world environment for free-roaming across a scaled-down recreation of the contiguous United States. The map is split into five regions: The Midwest, East Coast, The South, Mountain States, and West Coast. Each region had its own unique geographical features. Six main cities (one in each region, two in the Midwest) were featured in the game: Detroit and Chicago in the Midwest, New York City on the East Coast, Miami in The South, Las Vegas in the Mountain States, and Los Angeles on the West Coast. Various other cities, namely St. Louis, Washington, D.C., New Orleans, Dallas, Salt Lake City, Santa Fe, San Francisco, and Seattle, were also featured in the game. Over thirty smaller cities and towns lined the countryside, such as Nashville, Norfolk and others. It would take approximately 45 minutes in real time to drive from coast to coast in-game.

The single-player campaign is up to 20 hours long, and entailed infiltrating criminal groups with protagonist Alex Taylor (Troy Baker). Players also had the ability to participate in mini-games called Skills Challenges that could be found across the world. They were triggered by driving through them and included objectives such as weaving through gates and staying as close to a racing line as possible for a period of time. Players' scores were automatically saved so friends could try to beat their scores, in similar fashion to how Electronic Arts' Autolog works in games of the Need for Speed franchise. Missions could be played alone, with friends, or with online co-op matchmaking. The multiplayer mode allowed a maximum of eight players to compete in races and other gametypes. There were no in-game loading screens or pauses. Players could also build cars with a tie-in app for iOS and Android.

The Crew creative director Julian Gerighty has called the game a role-playing game with large-scale multiplayer elements. The multiplayer was not separate from the single-player. Players had the ability to form "crews" to race together or against ghost records. The game required a constant internet connection to play.

== Plot ==
The Crew's map is about 2000 times smaller than the real-life United States, and as such contains geographical inaccuracies to fit the cities and landmarks into the scale.

Prologue

The story begins with the player character Alex Taylor pursued by local law enforcement near Detroit. After losing the cops, he gets a call from his friend and father figure, Harry, who wants him to go to Detroit for a street race, after which he must meet his older brother Dayton Taylor, founder and leader (V8) of the 5-10 motor club. Later, Alex meets Dayton and drives him to the Ambassador Bridge for a meeting with V4 Dennis "Shiv" Jefferson over some missing money. Dayton speaks briefly with Shiv and walks back to his car, but Shiv shoots him from behind, killing him. Shiv drops the gun used at the scene before driving away, leaving Alex at the mercy of police officers responding to the shooting. Among the officers is corrupt FBI Agent Bill Coburn, who uses the gun Shiv dropped to frame Alex for murder. Alex is arrested on the scene and is sentenced to 13 years in prison.

Five years later, Alex, now in prison, meets FBI Agent Zoe Winters, who informs him that he will be temporarily released if he agrees to help her expose Coburn's corruption and arrest Shiv, the new leader of the 5-10s, for Dayton's murder. In doing so, Alex has to infiltrate the 5-10 motor club and climb up its hierarchy from "V2", all the way up to the "V8" (King V/Big Block/Big Eight).

Midwest

Zoe becomes Alex's FBI handler and helps him acquire a new car and set up his base in Detroit. She also sends Alex to meet Omar, a logistics expert, who agrees to get on board after Alex proves his worth by winning a race.

After completing several missions for Detroit 5-10 lieutenant Troy, Alex is sent to St. Louis to kill that city's V2. Alex and Zoe fake the V2's death, but Troy learns about this, kills her himself, and cuts ties with Alex.

Herschel Craig, the Chicago 5-10, then asks for Alex's help in claiming Troy's territory. As Alex wins more races, Craig hires Alex to replace a test driver in order to steal a highly modified Ford GT and give it to a V6. Troy learns of the plan and sends his men after him, but Alex escapes with the car. Afterwards, Alex receives his ink and Craig becomes the new V4.

East Coast

Alex is sent to New York City to help Eric Tsu, the city's V6, with the missing car shipments. He reunites with Harry and asks him to help. Harry reluctantly agrees, fearing Alex will meet the same fate as his brother Dayton. Over time, Harry becomes more secretive, making Alex and Zoe suspicious. They discover that Harry was behind the missing car shipments. Enraged, Alex confronts Harry and demands an explanation. Harry reveals that he was helping Dayton's girlfriend Connie, and son, Ben. Alex and Harry get Connie and Ben to safety by driving them out of the city. After winning races and completing Eric Tsu's missions, Alex is promoted to V2.

The South

Alex is sent to Miami with to claim the south from Cameron "Cam" Rockport, who has been killing 5-10s to stay in power, in retaliation to Shiv for killing his wife. Upon arriving in Miami, Alex meets Alita, a mechanic and Shiv's ex-girlfriend. He asks her for help in his quest to take down Shiv and she agrees, revealing Shiv physically abused her.

After claiming The South from Cam by beating him and his crew in a high-speed race, Bill Coburn anonymously calls Alex and gives him jobs to complete, including one to kill a man (later revealed to be Cam) interfering with his affairs. Alex saves Cam, who later supports Alex's plan to take down Shiv. Shiv then promotes Alex to V4 after hearing of his success in The South and sends him to Las Vegas.

Mountain States

In Las Vegas, Alex meets Roxanne, a skilled hacker. She joins Alex's crew to help, as she is looking for her sister, Daria. She later learns that Daria was killed by Shiv for getting in his way in a race. Roxanne gets a lead on Coburn's activity in the Mountain States. Zoe later finds out Coburn is selling impounded contraband and has Alex travel to Death Valley to collect evidence against Coburn. Coburn arrives at the scene and tries to flee from Alex, but is arrested and charged at the airport after a lenghty chase across Las Vegas. Impressed by Alex's performance, Shiv promotes him to V6 and sends him to Los Angeles.

West Coast

In Los Angeles, Alex meets Vincent, a former pro racer, to join his crew and help him win a racing tournament organised by Shiv to crown his second-in-command. Alex breaks Troy out of prison to get Shiv's favors, much to Troy's surprise. Alex is then asked to meet Troy, only to get himself trapped. Alex escapes and later finds and takes down Troy, getting him re-arrested. Alex eventually wins the tournament by winning the last race from San Francisco to Los Angeles. Shiv sets up a meeting to reveal Alex as his second-in-command, but the meeting is revealed to be a setup. Shiv actually intended to kill Alex upon learning of his vengeance plot against him, but Alex escapes. Alex, wielding a gun he got from a friend of Vincent, gatecrashes a 5-10 party with the intent of killing Shiv (who was present), but later calls him out to a race to win the V8 ink. Alex races Shiv and his crew throughout the city and wins, but Shiv refuses to give up. Alex chases Shiv and wrecks his car, leaving him to be arrested by the FBI.

Epilogue

After Shiv is arrested by the police as his car is totaled, Alex explains his love for racing as he is named the new V8 of the 5-10s.

== Development and release ==
The Ubisoft Ivory Tower development team included former Eden Games employees, and received assistance from Ubisoft Reflections. The game was planned with the intention to use the new consoles' social and cooperative play features. On 13 August 2014, Ubisoft confirmed that the game would be released on the Xbox 360 the same date as the other versions, with Asobo Studio leading the development and Ivory Tower, Ubisoft Reflections and Ubisoft Shanghai providing support. The Crew used Dunia as its video game engine modified with Ubisoft Ivory Tower's proprietary tools.

On 21 July 2014, Ubisoft released a closed beta of The Crew on the PC for a limited time only. The beta allowed players to play a portion of the story-driven missions in the Midwest and East Coast and free roam the entire United States of America at their own pace. Cars and a variety of other things such as driver levels and specifications for cars were limited. The second closed beta for PC took place from 25 to 29 August 2014. A PlayStation 4 and Xbox One console beta was released on 30 September 2014. Another closed beta for PlayStation 4 and Xbox One took place on 6 to 10 November 2014. An open beta for Xbox Live and PlayStation Network members also took place from 25 to 27 November 2014. As part of UBI30, a promotion which would bring seven Ubisoft free games to PC in 2016 as part of Ubisoft's 30th anniversary, the game was free to download from Uplay from September 14 to mid-October 2016, while the Xbox One version was made available free to Xbox Live Gold subscribers as part of Microsoft's Games with Gold program from June 16 to July 15, 2016.

The soundtrack for The Crew was composed by Joseph Trapanese. The track "Heavy As a Feather" was used in the official launch trailer for The Crew.

== Downloadable content ==
=== The Crew: Wild Run ===
The Crew: Wild Run was the first expansion pack to the 2014 game. It was developed by Ubisoft Ivory Tower and published by Ubisoft for PlayStation 4, Windows, and Xbox One. The expansion was announced at E3 2015 during Ubisoft's press conference. It was released on November 17, 2015.

Adding to the base gameplay, the expansion introduced motorcycles and a range of new cars, and new vehicle specifications such as monster trucks, drift cars, and dragsters, as well as a new multiplayer event, The Summit. In addition, the release of the expansion introduced a graphical overhaul for the game, via an update available to all players whether or not they owned the expansion.

=== The Crew: Calling All Units ===
The Crew: Calling All Units was the second expansion pack to the 2014 game. It was announced at Gamescom 2016 and was released on November 29, 2016, for PlayStation 4, Windows, and Xbox One alongside the Ultimate Edition, which bundled the base game, all the previously released downloadable content, and both Calling All Units and Wild Run expansions.

In Calling All Units, the player had the ability to play as a police officer, tasked with arresting street racers and smugglers. The expansion introduced a great number of police equipments as well as various types of cars for this purpose, in addition to more vehicles.

== Shutdown and reactions ==
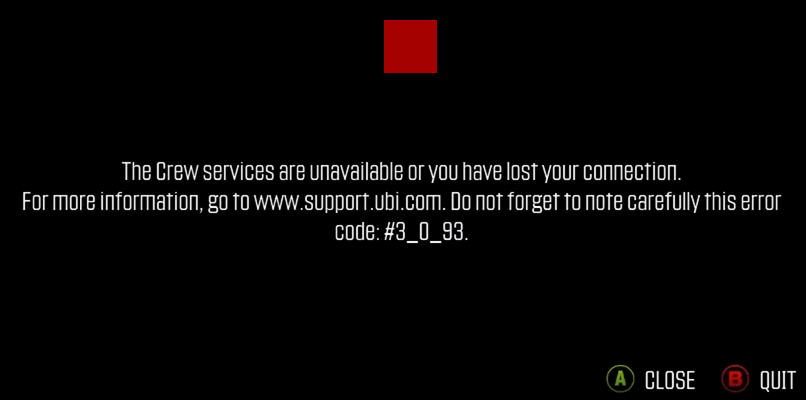
Error message upon opening the game after March 31, 2024

On December 14, 2023, Ubisoft delisted The Crew and its expansions from digital platforms on PC and consoles, including Steam, suspended sales of microtransactions, and announced that the game's servers would be shut down permanently on March 31, 2024, citing "upcoming server infrastructure and licensing constraints". Ubisoft also decided not to add an offline singleplayer mode to the game. The servers were permanently shut down as planned on that date. In early April 2024, days after the shutdown, Ubisoft began revoking licenses from players who have bought The Crew without providing refunds or any way to download the game files. The license revocations were criticized for setting a bad precedent for video game preservation and ownership, especially when players discovered that the game had unutilized programming for an offline mode, which was possible

The shutdown and revocations led to players review bombing the game's sequels, The Crew 2 and The Crew Motorfest, on Steam.

=== Stop Killing Games initiative ===
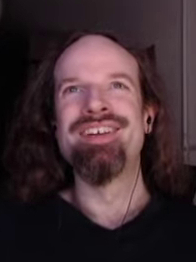
Ross Scott, the creator of Stop Killing Games

On the week of the server shutdown, Ross Scott — a YouTuber who created the machinima series Freeman's Mind, expressed opposition to video game shutdowns like The Crew's in videos uploaded to his YouTube channel since 2015 and had released a video about the game in 2018 noting the game would be shut down in the future due to its online only nature — launched an initiative called "Stop Killing Games" to encourage players to file a complaint with France's General Directorate of Competition, Consumption & Repression of Frauds (DGCCRF) to act on video game shutdowns, including that of The Crew. In July 2024, Scott's initiative became an active ballot within the European Citizens' Initiative, requiring 1 million signatures for the European Union to consider passing relevant legislation. Within several weeks the petition had accrued over 200,000 signatures, and by February 2026 reached more than 1.3 million when it was presented to the European Commission.

In response, the European Commission concluded that it could not impose a legal obligation to keep games playable after they stop being provided commercially. Instead, they pledged by the end of the year to begin discussions between the industry and consumer representatives about potential industry code of conduct for 'end of life' management, and to raise awareness about relevant consumer rights.

However, despite the initiative by Stop Killing Games, Ubisoft has still chosen not to add an offline mode to the game or bring it back in any form.

=== Lawsuits ===
On November 4, 2024, two Californians—Matthew Cassell and Alan Liu, who respectively purchased physical copies of the game from GameStop stores in early 2020 and November 2018—filed a class action lawsuit against Ubisoft in the United States District Court for the Eastern District of California. Cassell and Liu accused the company of misleading players into believing that their purchases of the game were permanent instead of buying limited licenses and for "falsely represent[ing]" that the physical copies contained the game's files instead of simply a key to unlock the DRM for the game. In the filed complaint, the two compared the shutdown of the game's servers to a person purchasing a pinball machine and placing it in their home, only to find it years later having suddenly been stripped of its parts, including "paddles" (flippers), the pinball, bumpers, and "the monitor that proudly displayed your unassailable high score", by the pinball machine's own manufacturer, rendering it unplayable.

Ubisoft, in its motion to dismiss the case, emphasized that there was no "unfettered ownership rights in the game" implied when a user purchased the game, and that the shutdown followed a notification period, following terms that were published on the game's retail box and in its digital EULA.

In June 2025, the lawsuit was dismissed without prejudice after the plaintiffs voluntarily withdrew.

In March 2026, French consumer group UFC-Que Choisir announced it had filed a lawsuit against Ubisoft over the games' shutdown, alleging that Ubisoft had misled consumers about their purchase and used abusive contractual clauses to remove players of ownership rights. The lawsuit is backed by the Stop Killing Games initiative.

=== Fan revival ===
After the shutdown of the game, efforts have been made to make the game functional again. A group of fans known as "The Crew Unlimited" ("TCU"), developed a server emulator by utilising dumps of the game's network activity from the time that the official servers were available, using a custom DLL file provided by authors of the software. The game is currently playable offline by hosting the server by the player themselves. In the future, an online mode may be implemented which will use connections to servers hosted by TCU.

In an interview with Eurogamer, project lead whammy4 stated that the TCU team "started working on the server emulator project a bit before the official server shutdown" and that certain parts of The Crew's logic had to be rewritten from scratch. Certain developers of The Crew have anonymously expressed gratitude towards the project.

On September 2, 2025, after additional testing, the developers stated that TCU is "feature complete". The revival was released on September 15.

Since the fan revival, TCU developers had made it possible to run the game on Linux and Macintosh computers running on Apple Silicon.

The developers of TCU (The Crew Unlimited) stated as of early 2026 that the online mode is coming at the end of 2026.

== Reception ==
Reception

Aggregate scores
Aggregator	Score
GameRankings	(PC) 72% (XONE) 60% (PS4) 59%
Metacritic	(PC) 71/100 (XONE) 64/100 (PS4) 61/100

Review scores
Publication	Score
Destructoid	7.5/10
Electronic Gaming Monthly	6/10
Eurogamer	8/10
Game Informer	7/10
GameRevolution	3/5
GameSpot	5/10
GamesRadar+	3.5/5
GameTrailers	6.2/10
IGN	6/10
Joystiq	3/5
PC Gamer (US)	70/100
Polygon	4.5/10
VideoGamer.com	6/10

The Crew received mixed reviews from critics. Critics overall praised the game's immense world, but disliked the game's technical issues relating to its online-only gameplay, as well as its complicated user interface and use of microtransactions. Aggregating review websites GameRankings and Metacritic gave the Windows version 72% based on 7 reviews and 71/100 based on 12 reviews, the Xbox One version 60% based on 14 reviews and 64/100 based on 18 reviews and the PlayStation 4 version 59% based on 37 reviews and 61/100 based on 60 reviews.

Mike Channell from Eurogamer gave the game an 8/10, praising its rich content, worthy side-missions and activities, enormous driveable space, successful blend between the story and the multiplayer, huge variety of scenery and rewarding and entertaining co-operative gameplay, but criticizing its poor story and lead character, "outrageous" AI, as well as the inclusion of microtransactions. He stated that "The Crew is an astonishing achievement, not only because of its vastness but also its level of fidelity and the authenticity of its character."

Matthew Kato from Game Informer gave the game a 7/10, praising the satisfying upgrade and car-purchasing system, as well as the decent voice-acting. However, he criticized the clichéd story and stated that "The Crew feels like an average arcade racer. There are some fun times, but you may be surprised to discover that America is a pretty empty place."

Josh Harmon from Electronic Gaming Monthly gave the game a 6/10, praising the game world, which he stated "has captured the spirit of America" and described the game as "the best open world in a racing game to date". However, he criticized the off-putting microtransactions, as well as poor story-telling and the pay-to-win model of the game. He stated that "Despite delivering an impressive playground, The Crew struggles to build out a worthwhile game experience around it."

Peter Brown from GameSpot gave the game a 5/10, also praising the massive game world, as well as the single-player mission, but criticizing the automatically activated missions, frustrating side-missions, such as the raid car missions and the fleeing missions, as well as outdated graphics, poor physics, AI and user interface, texture pop-in and disappointing cars, buildings and environment models. He also criticized the game for not encouraging players to form a crew to play missions. He summarized the review by saying that "The Crew isn't that good after all. When you can't play due to server issues, you find a new game to play and leave The Crew in your dust."

Despite the mixed reviews, the Academy of Interactive Arts & Sciences nominated The Crew for "Racing Game of the Year" during the 18th Annual D.I.C.E. Awards.

The Crew had shipped 2 million units by January 1, 2015. In May 2016, Ivory Tower announced that the game had been played by over 5 million players. On May 12, 2017, the game had reached 12 million players.

== Sequels ==
In May 2017, Ubisoft announced its sequel, The Crew 2. It was scheduled to be released worldwide in early 2018 for PlayStation 4, Windows, and Xbox One. In the sequel, the roster of vehicles expands to include planes, boats and motorcycles. The game was released on June 29, 2018.

In late January 2023, Ubisoft announced its second sequel, The Crew Motorfest. It was released on September 14, 2023 for PlayStation 4, PlayStation 5, Windows, Xbox One, and Xbox Series X/S. Unlike the two previous The Crew games, Motorfest is set in scaled-down recreations of the Hawaiian Islands of Oʻahu, Maui, and Kauaʻi.
