= A Plague Tale: Innocence =

2019 video game

- Developer: Asobo Studio
- Publisher: Focus Home Interactive
- Directors: David Dedeine; Kevin Choteau
- Producers: Brice Davin; Jamal Rguigui
- Designer: Kevin Choteau
- Programmer: Alain Guyet
- Artist: Olivier Ponsonnet
- Writer: Sébastien Renard
- Composer: Olivier Deriviere
- Series: A Plague Tale
- Engine: Zouna
- Platforms: PlayStation 4; Windows; Xbox One; Nintendo Switch; PlayStation 5; Xbox Series X/S
- Release: PS4, Windows, Xbox One; 14 May 2019; NS, PS5, Xbox Series X/S; 6 July 2021
- Genres: Action-adventure, stealth
- Mode: Single-player

A Plague Tale: Innocence is an action-adventure stealth game developed by Asobo Studio and published by Focus Home Interactive. It is the first installment in the A Plague Tale series. The game was released for PlayStation 4, Windows, and Xbox One in May 2019. It was made available on the cloud-based service Amazon Luna in November 2020. The PlayStation 5 and Xbox Series X/S versions of the game were released in July 2021, alongside a cloud version for the Nintendo Switch.

Set in mid-14th century Aquitaine, France, during the Hundred Years' War, the game focuses on the plight of Amicia de Rune and her ill brother Hugo as they flee from soldiers of the French Inquisition and from hordes of rats that are spreading the black plague. The player controls Amicia, using a combination of stealth and limited tools to hide from, distract, or knock out soldiers, evade rat hordes, and solve puzzles, incorporating elements of survival horror games.

A Plague Tale: Innocence received generally positive reviews from critics and sold over one million units by July 2020. A sequel, A Plague Tale: Requiem, was released in 2022.

== Gameplay ==
To progress in the game, the player needs to make use of fire and light to deter hordes of rats.

In A Plague Tale: Innocence, the player assumes control of Amicia de Rune from a third-person perspective. For the majority of the game, the player needs to utilize stealth to avoid hostile encounters, as enemies will kill Amicia instantly if they catch her. Amicia is equipped with a sling that can throw rocks to break chains, create distractions, or stun guards long enough for the rats to ambush them; she can also kill enemies with a headshot if their head is unprotected.

The game consists of a series of survival puzzles, which mostly consist of the player having to use specific methods to scare away or distract the hordes of hungry rats in order to gain access to new areas or direct them towards enemies. The primary method of warding rats off is fire, as they will seldom enter within the radius of burning torches and braziers. Amicia can craft special ammunition and supplies, which include fire-starting sulfur stones that ignite braziers, stink bombs that attract rats, or fire suppressants to extinguish torches carried by enemies. Amicia's younger brother, Hugo, can be directed towards specific tasks when Amicia is busy, and can also access certain areas that she cannot. However, this is risky, as Hugo will start to panic if left alone and can attract unwanted attention. Later in the game, the player can assume control of Hugo, who cannot craft items but can control rats and sneak through small spaces.

== Plot ==
In November 1348, Amicia de Rune is a 15-year-old French noble living in Aquitaine during the Hundred Years' War between England and France. Her five-year-old brother, Hugo, has been ill since birth; their mother, Beatrice, an alchemist, has sheltered him in their estate while trying to devise a cure. While hunting with her father Robert in the forest, Amicia encounters an unusual substance on the ground, and her dog Lion is gruesomely consumed by an unseen entity. French Inquisition troops, led by Lord Nicholas, arrive at the de Rune estate in search of Hugo, executing Robert and slaughtering the family servants. Beatrice helps her children escape and instructs Amicia to take Hugo to a doctor named Laurentius, and is then seemingly killed.

Wanted by the Inquisition, the children find the local village and monastery overrun with hordes of rats spreading black plague. They eventually reach Laurentius's farm and find him severely ill with the plague. Laurentius implores Amicia to finish her mother's work seconds before the farm is overrun by rats; the siblings flee with Laurentius's apprentice, Lucas, to seek the Chateau d'Ombrage, which once belonged to the de Rune family. As they cross a battlefield patrolled by English soldiers, Lucas explains that Hugo's blood carries a supernatural evil called the Prima Macula, which has lain dormant within certain noble bloodlines since the Plague of Justinian. Beatrice and Laurentius had been trying to find an elixir that would mitigate Hugo's symptoms, while Vitalis Benevent, the Grand Inquisitor of France, seeks to harness Hugo's power so that the Inquisition can rule France. Hugo and Amicia are briefly captured by the English but escape with the help of sibling thieves Mélie and Arthur; Arthur is captured as the others escape to Chateau d'Ombrage.

Lucas needs a forbidden book called the Sanguinis Itinera to complete the elixir. Amicia retrieves the book with the help of a young blacksmith named Rodric, while Mélie rescues her brother. Back at the Chateau, Arthur reveals that Beatrice is still alive but imprisoned. Amicia insists they not tell Hugo, but he overhears the conversation. His anger appears to worsen his symptoms, prompting Amicia and Lucas to return to the de Rune estate and look for Beatrice's research. In a hidden laboratory, they complete the elixir and administer it to Hugo. Angry at his sister for not telling him the truth, Hugo runs away to the Inquisition in order to find Beatrice. Vitalis injects himself with Hugo's blood, but due to Lucas' elixir, he is unable to fully attain the power of the Macula.

Hugo escapes and finds Beatrice. Before their recapture, she reveals that the Macula gives him the power to control the rats. Vitalis threatens Beatrice's life to force Hugo's powers to fully awaken. Chateau d'Ombrage is then attacked by a swarm of rats guided by Hugo, still angry at Amicia. Nicholas, who is accompanying him, orders Hugo to kill Amicia, but she convinces her brother to reject the Inquisition. Nicholas kills Arthur, prompting the siblings to work together and battle Nicholas until the rats consume him. The children decide to confront Vitalis.

As they fight their way to Vitalis's cathedral, Rodric sacrifices himself to protect Hugo and Amicia. Vitalis awaits their arrival, having bred thousands of white rats that only he can control. Hugo ultimately overpowers Vitalis and Amicia kills him. Three days later, both the rats and the plague have disappeared and life begins to return to normal; many remain wary of Hugo and his power, including Mélie, who parts ways with the group. Amicia, Hugo, Lucas, and an ailing Beatrice leave in search of a new home.

== Development ==
The game's development was led by Asobo Studio. It is their first original title since the team created the racing game Fuel (2009), and the company wanted to create a narrative-driven experience inspired by The Last of Us and Brothers: A Tale of Two Sons. The main theme of A Plague Tale: Innocence is family and how the characters' relationships are challenged during adverse circumstances. Another important theme is innocence. Hugo, in particular, will observe the player character's behaviors and slowly transform from an innocent boy to a ruthless individual. Child actors Charlotte McBurney and Logan Hannan provided their voice for Amicia and Hugo, respectively. The two also participated in the writing process by suggesting changes to dialogue and alternative takes. The actors adopted French accents for dialogue, but in the sequel, they reverted to using their native British accents. Up to 5,000 rats can appear on-screen simultaneously. To ensure the game can handle rendering so many enemies without sacrificing performance, the team introduced four layers of details when rendering the rats, in which rats furthest away from the player character exist as a "background, non-animated mesh", whereas the rats closest to the player are animated in detail.

Publisher Focus Home Interactive announced the game in January 2017 as The Plague. A first look game trailer appeared at E3 2017. The game was released worldwide for PlayStation 4, Windows, and Xbox One on 14 May 2019. The game was released for Amazon Luna on 24 November 2020. The Nintendo Switch, PlayStation 5 and Xbox Series X/S versions of the game was released on 6 July 2021. The Nintendo Switch version was playable via cloud.

=== Downloadable content ===
The "Coats of Arms" DLC is available for all the three platforms, and came bundled with the pre-order version of the game. It adds three alternate skins for Amicia and Hugo's outfits and coats of arms. The additional content is cosmetic in nature.

== Reception ==
Reception

Aggregate score
Aggregator	Score
Metacritic	PC: 81/100; PS4: 81/100; PS5: 82/100; XONE: 83/100

Review scores
Publication	Score
Destructoid	8/10
GameRevolution	3.5/5
GameSpot	8/10
GamesRadar+	3.5/5
IGN	7/10
Jeuxvideo.com	16/20
PCGamesN	8/10
Screen Rant	5/5
Windows Central	4.5/5

A Plague Tale: Innocence received "generally favorable" reviews from critics, according to review aggregator website Metacritic.

=== Sales ===
In the United Kingdom, the game was the ninth-best-selling retail game in its week of release. In July 2020, Focus Home Interactive announced that it had sold over one million units.

=== Accolades ===
Year	Award	Category	Result	Ref.
2019	2019 Golden Joystick Awards	Best Audio	Nominated	
2019	Titanium Awards	Game of the Year	Nominated	
2019	Titanium Awards	Best Art	Nominated	
2019	Titanium Awards	Best Game Design	Nominated	
2019	Titanium Awards	Best Narrative Design	Nominated	
2019	Titanium Awards	Best Adventure Game	Nominated	
2019	The Game Awards 2019	Best Narrative	Nominated	
2019	Steam Awards	Outstanding Story-Rich Game	Won	
2020	New York Game Awards	Big Apple Award for Best Game of the Year	Nominated	
2020	New York Game Awards	Off Broadway Award for Best Indie Game	Nominated	
2020	New York Game Awards	Herman Melville Award for Best Writing	Nominated	
2020	NAVGTR Awards	Animation, Artistic	Nominated	
2020	NAVGTR Awards	Animation, Technical	Nominated	
2020	NAVGTR Awards	Art Direction, Period Influence	Won	
2020	NAVGTR Awards	Camera Direction in a Game Engine	Nominated	
2020	NAVGTR Awards	Control Design, 3D	Nominated	
2020	NAVGTR Awards	Costume Design	Nominated	
2020	NAVGTR Awards	Direction in a Game Cinema	Nominated	
2020	NAVGTR Awards	Gameplay Design, New IP	Nominated	
2020	NAVGTR Awards	Game, Original Adventure	Won	
2020	NAVGTR Awards	Lighting/Texturing	Nominated	
2020	NAVGTR Awards	Original Dramatic Score, New IP	Nominated	
2020	NAVGTR Awards	Performance in a Drama, Lead (Charlotte McBurney)	Won	
2020	NAVGTR Awards	Performance in a Drama, Supporting (Edan Hayhurst)	Nominated	
2020	NAVGTR Awards	Performance in a Drama, Supporting (Tabitha Rubens)	Nominated	
2020	NAVGTR Awards	Sound Editing in a Game Cinema	Nominated	
2020	NAVGTR Awards	Sound Effects	Nominated	
2020	NAVGTR Awards	Use of Sound, New IP	Nominated	
2020	NAVGTR Awards	Writing in a Drama	Won	
2020	Pégases Awards 2020	Best Game	Won	
2020	Pégases Awards 2020	Best Artistic Design	Won	
2020	Pégases Awards 2020	Best Sound Design	Won	
2020	Pégases Awards 2020	Best Narrative Design	Nominated	
2020	Pégases Awards 2020	Best Game Design	Won	
2020	Pégases Awards 2020	Best Game Setting	Won	
2020	Pégases Awards 2020	Best Character	Won	
2020	SXSW Gaming Awards	Excellence in Narrative	Nominated	
2020	16th British Academy Games Awards	Technical Achievement	Nominated	

== Sequel ==
A sequel, titled A Plague Tale: Requiem, was released on 18 October 2022 for Nintendo Switch, PlayStation 5, Windows, and Xbox Series X/S. The Nintendo Switch version is a cloud-based game.

== Television series ==
A television series adaptation to be produced by Mediawan in association with Asobo and Focus Home was announced in March 2022.
