= Asobo Studio =

French video game developer

Asobo Studio SAS
- Type: Private
- Industry: Video games
- Founded: 17 October 2002; 23 years ago
- Founders: Sébastien Wloch; David Dedeine; Ralph Musti; Martial Bossard; Nicolas Coquard; Cédric Rousseau; Frédéric Seiss; Franck Manon; Alain Guyet; Nicolas Becavin; Patrice Bourroncle; Andreas Nick
- Headquarters: Bordeaux, France
- Key people: Sébastien Wloch; David Dedeine
- Revenue: ▲€7 million (2014)
- Number of employees: 250 (2022)
- Website: www.asobostudio.com

Asobo Studio SAS is a French video game developer based in Bordeaux and founded in 2002. The studio is most known for developing video game adaptations of several Pixar movies, A Plague Tale: Innocence, and the 2020 and 2024 versions of Microsoft Flight Simulator. To develop most of its games, it uses its own game engine called Zouna, which was originally developed in the 1990s by some of their own employees who used to work at Kalisto Entertainment. It was later further developed by Asobo. The studio's name is derived from the Japanese word "asobō" (遊ぼう) that means "let's play".

== History ==
In 2002, a group of twelve video game developers purchased the rights to the multiplayer PlayStation 2 video game Super Farm from their previous employer, Kalisto Entertainment and founded Asobo Studio. The game was published in 2003 by Ignition Entertainment as its debut title. During the following years, the studio developed several games for various platforms, until being chosen by publisher THQ to create the video game adaptation of Pixar film Ratatouille. Asobo started increasing its growth-speed, recruiting about 20% new employees a year, leading to two separate production lines. Asobo was selected to develop the video game adaptation of Pixar's following films WALL-E and Up.

During the 2008 Games Convention, the video game publisher Codemasters announced Fuel, a racing game developed by Asobo Studio. Fuel was released in 2009 for the Xbox 360, PlayStation 3 and PC. The studio worked on Kinect Rush: A Disney-Pixar Adventure for Xbox 360 Kinect between 2010 and 2012. The game features a scanning process, enabling the player to create their own Pixar avatar, looking like them. It features characters from Ratatouille, The Incredibles, Cars, Up and Toy Story. The game was published by Microsoft and Disney Interactive Studios in March 2012.

In 2014, Asobo Studio partnered with Ubisoft to release Monopoly Family Fun pack on PlayStation 3, PlayStation 4, Xbox 360 and Xbox One, including Monopoly Plus, My Monopoly and Monopoly Deal, as well as The Crew for Xbox 360. In 2016, Asobo Studio partnered with Microsoft again to release two games on HoloLens: Fragments and Young Conker. Both games are available in the Development Edition, released on March 30, 2016. Asobo Studio was the first independent developer in Holographic Entertainment and won the 2016 French Video Game Creator Prize awarded by Syntec Numérique EY and SNJV. In 2017, the studio announced A Plague Tale: Innocence, an adventure game, released for PC and consoles in 2019 and published by Focus Home Interactive. They also worked with Engine Software to develop Monopoly for Nintendo Switch, which came out later that year. On August 18, 2020, its next game, Microsoft Flight Simulator, was released for Microsoft Windows.

In 2021, Sagard NewGen purchased a stake of just over 30% for €20 million, valuing the company at approximately €65 million.

In March 2021, Asobo's Microsoft Flight Simulator won the Pégase for Best French video game of the year. This is the second consecutive year that the studio has been awarded after A Plague Tale: Innocence in 2020. The sequel of A Plague Tale: Innocence, titled A Plague Tale: Requiem, was released on October 18, 2022. The studio is developing a prequel Resonance: A Plague Tale Legacy, set to launch in 2026.

== Games developed ==
Year	Game	Publisher	Platform(s)
2003	Super Farm	Ignition Entertainment	PlayStation 2
2004	Sitting Ducks	LSP	PlayStation 2, Windows
2004	The Mummy: The Animated Series	HIP Interactive	PlayStation 2, Windows
2005	CT Special Forces: Fire for Effect	HIP Interactive	PlayStation 2, Xbox, Windows
2006	Garfield: A Tail of Two Kitties	The Game Factory	PlayStation 2, Windows
2007	Ratatouille	THQ	PlayStation 2, Xbox, GameCube, Wii, Windows, Mac
2008	WALL-E	THQ	PlayStation 2, PlayStation Portable, Windows, Mac
2009	Fuel	Codemasters	Xbox 360, PlayStation 3, Windows
2009	Up	THQ	PlayStation 2, PlayStation Portable, Windows, Mac
2010	Racket Sports Party	Ubisoft	Wii
2010	Toy Story 3	Disney Interactive Studios	PlayStation 2, PlayStation Portable
2010	Racket Sports	Ubisoft	PlayStation 3
2012	Kinect Rush: A Disney–Pixar Adventure	Microsoft Studios	Xbox 360, Xbox One, Windows
2014	The Crew	Ubisoft	Xbox 360 (Note: Asobo developed the Xbox 360 port for this game. The PlayStation 4, Xbox One and Windows versions were developed by Ubisoft Ivory Tower and Ubisoft Reflections)
2014	Monopoly Plus	Ubisoft	PlayStation 3, PlayStation 4, Xbox 360, Xbox One, Xbox Series X/S, Windows (Note: The Nintendo Switch port (titled Monopoly for Nintendo Switch) was developed by Engine Software)
2016	The Last Frontier	Asobo Studio	Windows
2016	Fragments – HoloLens	Microsoft Studios	Windows
2016	Young Conker – HoloLens	Microsoft Studios	Windows
2016	ReCore	Microsoft Studios	Xbox One, Windows
2017	Disneyland Adventures	Microsoft Studios	Xbox One, Windows (Note: Original Xbox 360 release developed by Frontier Developments)
2017	Zoo Tycoon: Ultimate Animal Collection	Microsoft Studios	Xbox One, Windows
2018	The Crew 2	Ubisoft	PlayStation 4, Xbox One, Windows
2019	A Plague Tale: Innocence	Focus Home Interactive	PlayStation 4, PlayStation 5, Xbox One, Xbox Series X/S, Nintendo Switch, Windows
2020	Microsoft Flight Simulator	Xbox Game Studios	Xbox Series X/S, Windows
2022	A Plague Tale: Requiem	Focus Entertainment	PlayStation 5, Xbox Series X/S, Nintendo Switch, Windows
2024	Microsoft Flight Simulator 2024	Xbox Game Studios	Xbox Series X/S, Windows, PlayStation 5
2026	Resonance: A Plague Tale Legacy	Focus Entertainment	PlayStation 5, Windows, Xbox Series X/S
