= List of fictional nobility =

Aristocracy of fiction

This is a list of fictional nobility that have appeared in various works of fiction. This list is organized by noble rank and limited to well-referenced, notable examples of fictional members of nobility.

== Dukes and duchesses ==
These are fictional characters with the title of "duke" or "duchess".

Fictional duke or duchess	Work	Notes
The Duke of Alasia	King of Cadonia	The reluctant heir presumptive to the throne of Cadonia and the father of Princess Marie.
Duchess Annagovia	Discworld	The ruler of the Duchy of Borogravia.
Leto I Atreides	Dune	The Duke of House Atreides, and the father of Paul Atreides.
Paul Atreides	Dune	The Duke of House Atreides after the death of his father, Leto Atreides I. Also served as Padishah Emperor of the Known Universe when House Corrino was ousted and the head of House Atreides became ex officio to the emperor.
Duke Aymon	Matter of France	The Duke of Dordone, the son of Doon de Mayence, and the father of Renaud de Montauban.
Simon Bassett	Bridgerton	The Duke of Hastings, a character in Julia Quinn's Regency romance novels and the Netflix adaptation of the same name. Simon inherits his estranged father's title upon his death and swears off children to deny him the legacy of an heir of his line.
Edmund Blackadder	The Black Adder	Edmund, Duke of Edinburgh, the second son of the fictional King Richard IV of England, whose descendants subsequently fall in status in future generations.
Diego de Castamar	The Cook of Castamar	The Duke of Castamar.
Ascoyne D'Ascoyne	Kind Hearts and Coronets	The 9th Duke of Chalfont. The head of a private bank, D'Ascoyne hires his previously disowned relative Louis Mazzini after initially rebuffing him following the death of his son (unaware that Mazzini killed him and other members of the D'Ascoyne out of revenge and to gain the dukedom himself). After Ethelred, the 8th Duke, is murdered by Mazzini, D'Ascoyne becomes the 9th Duke but dies from the shock of learning this.
Ethelred D'Ascoyne	Kind Hearts and Coronets	The 8th Duke of Chalfont. Murdered by his previously disowned heir presumptive Louis Mazzini in a staged hunting accident to avenge his mother and ascend to the dukedom himself.
Edmun Dragonsbane	Dragon's Dogma	Also known as "The Wyrmking", he is the immortal ruler of the Duchy of Gransys. Edmun had several wives, including Lady Aelinor of Meloire, but has no heir to ascend his throne.
Duke Vedam Dren	The Elder Scrolls	The Duke of the Imperial District of Vvardenfell in the province of Morrowind.
The Duchess	Alice's Adventures in Wonderland	One of the inhabitants of Wonderland.
Duke Duralumin	Princess Knight	The evil duke who inherits the throne of Silverland.
Isabella de Frissac	Isabella	An uninhibited noblewoman who works as a secret agent for Cardinal Richelieu.
Duchess Gloriana XII	The Mouse That Roared	The ruler of the independent Duchy of Grand Fenwick, a tiny nation located in the Alps. In the books she is a young woman, aged 22 in the first novel, of marked beauty and competence. In the film, though similarly competent to her book equivalent, she is an elderly woman, and a widow.
Gloriant, Duke of Bruuyswijc	Gloriant	The protagonist of one of the four medieval Dutch dramas contained in the Van Hulthem Manuscript.
Duke of Dunstable	Patience	The leader of the 35th Dragoon Guards.
Dorian Hawkmoon	The History of the Runestaff	The Duke of Köln and an incarnation of the Eternal Champion.
Edward Horniman	The Gentlemen	The 10th Duke of Halstead, a British Army Captain who unexpectedly inherits his family's title and estate upon his estranged father's death, bypassing his older brother, and learns of his family's connection to organized crime.
Duke Igthorn	Adventures of the Gummi Bears	The main villain of the series who rules the land and castle of Drekmore and has an army of ogres.
Teteru Lemercier	The World Is Still Beautiful	The reigning duke of the Rain Dukedom and the father of Princess Nike Lemercier.
Grand Duke Leonid	Le Grand Duc	The Russian grand duke on a diplomatic visit to the United States, whom Luke escorts through the wild west in volume 40 of the Lucky Luke comic series by Moris.
Louis D'Ascoyne Mazzini	Kind Hearts and Coronets	The 10th Duke of Chalfont. Originally disowned by the D'Ascoyne family due to his mother eloping with and marrying an Italian opera singer, Mazzini sought to murder the incumbent 8th Duke of Chalfont and the seven other family members between himself and the dukedom.
Doña Mercedes	The Cook of Castamar	The Duchess of Rioseco.
The Duke of Monroth	Moulin Rouge!	A rich and powerful duke who invests in a play being performed at the Moulin Rouge.
Alaric Morgan	Deryni novels	The seventh Duke of Corwyn.
Naimon	Matter of France	The Duke of Bavaria.
Duke Orsino	Twelfth Night	The Duke of Illyria.
Orlando, Duke of Oxford	The King's Man	A British aristocrat, owner of the Kingsman tailor shop and founder of the agency.
The Grand Duke of Owls	Rock-a-Doodle	A giant magical owl and the main villain of the film. In the original play Chantecler on which the film Rock-a-Doodle is loosely based, the character is simply called "the Grand Duke".
Alaric Pendlebury-Davenport	Blandings series	The Duke of Dunstable, a recurring character in P. G. Wodehouse's series of stories centering around the fictional Blandings Castle.
The Duke of Plaza-Toro	The Gondoliers	One of the main characters in the opera, whose daughter is secretly married to Luiz, the heir to the kingdom of Barataria.
Prospero	The Tempest	The rightful Duke of Milan and the father of Miranda.
Duke de Richleau	The Forbidden Territory	The Duke De Richleau is a fictional character created by Dennis Wheatley who appeared in 11 novels beginning with "The Forbidden Territory".
The Duke and Duchess of Soleanna	Sonic the Hedgehog (2006)	The previous rulers of the sovereign island country of Soleanna and the parents of Princess Elise.
Mortimer Sto Helit	Discworld	Formerly the apprentice to Death, Mortimer (also known as Mort) is elevated to Duke of Sto Helit by Queen Kelirehenna of Sto Lat for saving her life after the previous Duke died due to his lifetimer being accidentally destroyed.
Susan Sto Helit	Discworld	The Duchess of Sto Helit.
Duchess Sophie von Teschen	The Illusionist	The love interest of Eisenheim the illusionist.
Theo, Duke of Tintagel	The Buccaneers	The most eligible bachelor competing for Nan St. George's affections in Edith Wharton's unfinished last novel about dollar princessess seeking titled husbands.
The Duke of Velcronia	Sonic Underground	The minor antagonist of the series.
Sam Vimes	Discworld	The Duke of Ankh.
The Duke of Weselton	Frozen	An antagonist in the film.
Gerald Wimsey	Lord Peter Wimsey series	The Duke of Denver, a character in the series by Dorothy L. Sayers. He is the older brother of Lord Peter Wimsey, a gentleman detective who solves mysteries for his own amusement. The title is eventually inherited by Peter.
The Duke of Zill	Felix the Cat: The Movie	The evil ruler of the Land of Zill who takes over the Kingdom of Oriana with his robotic army. He is the uncle of Princess Oriana.
Her Enlightened Highness, Duchess Anna Henrietta	Witcher	The Duchess of Toussaint, within the Nilfgaardian Empire. A distant relation to Emperor Emhyr. She hosts Geralt and his party as they venture in search for Ciri, then later invites him back to the Duchy to deal with The Beast of Beauclair.

== Marquesses and marchionesses ==
These are fictional characters with the title of "marquess" (or "marquis") or "marchioness".

Fictional marquess or marchioness	Work	Notes
Enrique de Arcona	The Cook of Castamar	The Marquis of Soto and Campomedina.
Marquis Thomas d'Apcher	Brotherhood of the Wolf (a.k.a. Le Pacte des loups)	A protagonist and narrator.
Marquis of Brotherton	Is He Popenjay	Tale of a nasty marquis who mistreats his family, hates England and marries an Italian woman of dubious antecedents by whom - supposedly - he has an heir, who bears the courtesy title of Lord Popenjoy.
Marquis de Carabas	"Puss in Boots"	A poor low-born young man who, with the help of his intelligent cat, gains the wealth and status of a nobleman. Later variations of this character include the following: The Marquess of Carabas in the novel Vivian Grey.; The Marquis de Carabas in the TV series Neverwhere and its companion novelization of the same name.; Pierre, the Marquis de Carabas, in the webcomic No Rest for the Wicked.
Marquise De Cat	Root	The imperial ruler of an industrialized state who occupies the forest in which the game takes place.
Charles Darnay	A Tale of Two Cities	A wealthy Frenchman who gains the title of Marquis around the time of the French Revolution.
Vernon Dauntry, The Marquis of Alverstoke	Frederica	An elegant, jaded nobleman whose life is turned upside down by the arrival in town of his Merriville cousins.
Emilia	Sítio do Picapau Amarelo	The Marchioness of Rabicó.
Marquis St. Evrémonde	A Tale of Two Cities	A pitiless and arrogant French aristocrat, and the uncle of Charles Darnay.
The Marquis de Lantenac	Ninety-Three	A commander of a group of royalists during the French Revolution.
Marquis Andrealphus	Helluva Boss	Brother of Stella and brother-in-law to Stolas, like other characters from the show he is lifted directly from the lesser key of Solomon.
Marquess of Marchmain	Brideshead Revisited	Alexander Flyte, father of Lord Sebastian Flyte and Lady Julia Flyte, love interests of the novel's narrator Charles Ryder.
The Marquis de la Tour d'Azyr	Scaramouche	A cruel French nobleman.
Carla Rosón Caleruega	Elite	She is the daughter of a marquess and is extremely wealthy.
Marchioness of Auld Reekie	Can You Forgive Her? (Palliser novels by Anthony Trollope)	Aunt to Lady Glencora M'Cluskie, who uses hard persuasion to get her to give up Burgo Fitzgerald and marry Plantagenet Palliser, heir apparent to the Duke of Omnium and Gatherum
Hugh MacClare, Marquess of Flintshire	Downton Abbey	A Scottish nobleman and relative of the Crawleys.
Marquise Spinneret Mindfang	Homestuck	A high-blooded pirate and ancestor of Vriska Serket.
Marquis Ogawara	Mystery of Rampo	The mysterious lord whom Shizuko, the woman Rampo has been following, has an affair with.
Edith Pelham	Downton Abbey	The Marchioness of Hexham, second daughter of Robert Crawley, Earl of Grantham.
Herbert "Bertie" Pelham	Downton Abbey	The Marquess of Hexham.
Marquess of Queensberry	Mike Tyson Mysteries	The title of John Douglas, however out of ignorance the rest of the cast just calls him Marques.
Marquis de la Taillade-Espinasse	Perfume	An eccentric amateur scientist who champions his "fluidal theory" of a lethal fluid that originates at the centre of the Earth.
Marquis Vincent Bisset de Gramont	John Wick: Chapter 4	A high-ranking member of The High Table tasked to kill John Wick, the main protagonist.
Marquis of Serault	Dragon Age: The Last Court	A male or female ruler of the town of Serault, famed across the Orlesian Empire for its glassworks but shunned by most nobles due to the Shame of Serault, an ancestor infamous for his insanity.
Jonathan Blake, Marquess of Doon	The Seance of Blake Manor	One of only two surviving members of the Blake family, the other being his son, Walter Blake. The hotel where the game takes place was once a part of the Blake manor.

== Counts and countesses ==
These are fictional characters with the title of "count" or "countess".

Fictional count or countess	Work	Notes
Count Alucard	Son of Dracula	The son of Count Dracula.
Augusto Alvear	Víctor Ros	The Count of Teresillas, Grandee of Spain.
Athos	The d'Artagnan Romances	The Count de la Fère, and one of the three Musketeers.
Josephine Balsamo	Arsène Lupin	The Countess of Cagliostro, an antagonist in Maurice Leblanc's Arsène Lupin series of novels and subsequently adapted in numerous comics, films, TV, theater, and derivative works.
Count Baltar	Battlestar Galactica	The leading antagonist in the series, who betrayed humanity by helping the Cylons.
Pierre Bezukhov	War and Peace	A central character in the story.
Count Bleck	Super Paper Mario	The main antagonist of the game, who seeks to destroy the universe.
Count Bloodcount	Looney Tunes	A vampire.
Count Bobby	The Adventures of Count Bobby	A fictional Viennese comic figure in the anthologies of collected Graf Bobby jokes and films.
Tracy Bond	On Her Majesty's Secret Service	The Contessa Teresa di Vicenzo, and a Bond girl, featured in both the novel and the film.
Carnivore	Marvel Comics	His real name is Andreas Zorba. He is a Greek count.
Count Chocula	Monster Cereals	Advertising mascot for "Count Chocula" breakfast cereal.
Count von Count	Sesame Street	A friendly vampire-like character who is obsessed with counting everything.
Cora Crawley	Downton Abbey	The Countess of Grantham.
Violet Crawley	Downton Abbey	The Dowager Countess of Grantham.
Edmond Dantès	The Count of Monte Cristo	The main character of the story.
Tony DiMera	Days of Our Lives	A member of the upper-class Italian DiMera family.
Count Dooku	Star Wars	The Count of Serenno, a Separatist leader, and a Sith apprentice of Palpatine.
Count Dracula	Dracula	A vampire and the title character of the story. Later variations of this character include the following: Dracula, the main antagonist in the video game series Castlevania.; Alucard, an anti-hero in the manga and anime series Hellsing.
Count Duckula	Count Duckula	A vampire duck.
Count Fenring	Dune	A friend, advisor, and agent of Emperor Shaddam IV.
Count Floyd	Second City Television (SCTV)	A fictional horror host and vampire played by comic actor Joe Flaherty. Later reprised in The Completely Mental Misadventures of Ed Grimley.
Count Fosco	The Woman in White by Wilkie Collins	Isidor Ottavio Baldassare Fosco – An Italian count who sets the whole story line in motion.
Count Fujiwara	The Handmaiden	The sobriquet of a con man attempting to court the Lady Hideko Izumi in Japanese-occupied Korea.
Count Gauthier	Count Gismond	One of two counts in the poem, the other being the title character Count Gismond.
The Countess Gertrude	Gormenghast	The 76th Countess and Titus Groan's mother.
Count Gismond	Count Gismond	The title character in the poem.
Count Kyros Granado	Betrothed to My Sister's Ex	A successful and wealthy merchant in the land of Dilts, whose mixed heritage leads many noblewomen to approach him only for his wealth, much to his disdain.
Harpy	DC Comics	Her real name is Countess Denise de Sevigne. She is an aviator, the sister of Andre de Sevigne, and an enemy of Enemy Ace.
Count Iblis	Battlestar Galactica	An alien.
Carmilla / Mircalla, Countess Karnstein	Carmilla	A vampire.
Elisabeth von Lahnstein	Verbotene Liebe	The Countess of Lahnstein.
Countess Palatine Ingrid von Marburg	Salem	The last and oldest member of a line of Germanic witches.
Francisco Marlango	The Cook of Castamar	The Count of Armiño.
Godefroy de Montmirail	Les Visiteurs	The Count of Montmirail, Apremont and Papincourt.
Cordelia Naismith	Vorkosigan Saga	Also known as Countess Vorkosigan. She is a citizen of Beta Colony.
Count Nefaria	Marvel Comics	A wealthy Italian aristocrat and supervillain.
Count Olaf	A Series of Unfortunate Events	The main antagonist in the series.
Count Orlok	Nosferatu	A vampire based on Count Dracula.
Count Paris	Romeo and Juliet	A suitor of Juliet.
Count Andreas Petofi	Dark Shadows	A powerful warlock.
Comte de Rochefort	The d'Artagnan Romances	An initial foe and later friend of d'Artagnan.
Countess Vera Rossakoff	The Big Four	A Russian aristocrat.
Nikolai Rostov	War and Peace	Characters in Leo Tolstoy's novel War and Peace illustrating Napoleon's impact on Russian aristocratic society.
Petya Rostov	War and Peace	Characters in Leo Tolstoy's novel War and Peace illustrating Napoleon's impact on Russian aristocratic society.
Natasha Rostova	War and Peace	Characters in Leo Tolstoy's novel War and Peace illustrating Napoleon's impact on Russian aristocratic society.
Count Tyrone Rugen	The Princess Bride	The "six-fingered man" in William Goldman's book. Portrayed in the film adaptation by Christopher Guest, who would later become a real baron as the 5th Baron Haden-Guest.
Constance, Countess of Trentham	Gosford Park	The highest ranking guest at Sir William McCordle's dinner party as defined by seating order of the downstairs staff.
Count Vertigo	DC Comics	A supervillain and the last descendant of the royal family of Vlatava, a fictional Eastern European country.
Miles Vorkosigan	Vorkosigan Saga	A protagonist of the series.
Count Weirdly	Slylock Fox & Comics for Kids	A mad scientist who lives in a castle and commits mischief.
Valentina Allegra de Fontaine	Marvel Comics	A spy descended from Italian nobility.
Strahd von Zarovich	Dungeons & Dragons	A vampire and the ruler of the land of Barovia.
Count Rupert of Mountjoy	The Mouse That Roared	A nobleman in the court of Duchess Gloriana XII. In the films, in which he is played first by Peter Sellers, and later by Ron Moody.

== Earls ==
These are fictional characters with the title of "earl".

Fictional earl	Work	Notes
Bartholomew	The Pillars of the Earth	The Earl of Shiring.
The Earl of Burnstead	Ruggles of Red Gap	The British nobleman and womanizer.
Robert Crawley	Downton Abbey	The Earl of Grantham.
The Earl of Darlington	The Remains of the Day	The Lord of Darlington Hall and Mr Stevens' employer. His support of Nazi Germany in the 1930s results in public disgrace following WWII.
Lord Adalbert D'Ysquith	A Gentleman's Guide to Love and Murder	The 8th Earl of Highhurst. His death by poisoning leads his successor Montague "Monty" D'Ysquith Navarro to be falsely charged and tried for his murder. (Although Monty had planned to poison the Earl and had killed several other members of the D'Ysquith family to inherit the earldom, he ultimately decided against it.)
Lord Emsworth	Blandings stories	The Earl of Emsworth and the head of the Threepwood family.
Robert Fitzooth	Some "Robin Hood" stories	He is Robin Hood in some stories that depict him as a dispossessed Earl of Huntingdon.
Uncle Fred	Blandings stories	The Earl of Ickenham.
Lord Glenallan	The Antiquary	The Earl of Glenallan.
Titus Groan	Gormenghast	The 77th Earl of Groan.
Earl Haraldson	Vikings	The Earl of Kattegat during season 1 of the series.
The Earl of Lemongrab	Adventure Time	An antagonist and the first being Princess Bubblegum created.
DI Thomas Lynley	Inspector Lynley, The Inspector Lynley Mysteries & Lynley	A detective and the reluctant 8th Earl of Asherton.
Camber MacRorie	Deryni novels	The Earl of Culdi.
The Earl of Mountararat	Iolanthe	One of the ward Phyllis's lovers, and a friend of the Chancellor.
Lord Montague "Monty" D'Ysquith Navarro	A Gentleman's Guide to Love and Murder	The 9th Earl of Highhurst. To escape his life of poverty, because of which his childhood love Sibella turns down his proposal of marriage, Navarro vows to murder the current Earl and the seven members of his estranged family, the D'Ysquiths, standing ahead of him in the line of succession to the earldom.
Robert Norramby	The Railway Series	The 5th Earl of Sodor. He sits on the council of the Duchy of Lancaster and is also called the "Duke of Sodor" by the island's inhabitants.
Melrose Plant	Richard Jury series of mystery novels	The Earl of Caverness.
Sepulchrave	Titus Groan	The 76th Earl of Groan and Titus Groan's father.
Cyril Sheldrake	DC Comics	The second of three superheroes known as Knight. He inherits the title Earl of Wordenshire after the death of his father Percival Sheldrake.
Percival "Percy" Sheldrake	DC Comics	The Earl of Wordenshire and the first of three superheroes known as Knight.
The Earl of Lessford	The Black Rose	A title passed through three generations in the course of the book.
Lord Snooty	The Beano	A comic strip character.
Roderick Spode	Jeeves stories	The Earl of Sidcup.
The Earl Tolloller	Iolanthe	One of the ward Phyllis's lovers, and a friend of the Chancellor.
John Arthur Molyneux Errol	Little Lord Fauntleroy	The Earl of Dorincourt.
Ciel Phantomhive	Kuroshitsuji	The Earl Phantomhive. Also known as the Queen's Guard dog like previous Earls Phantomhive, tasked with eliminating criminals and solving cases in the underworld for Queen Victoria.

== Viscounts and viscountesses ==
These are fictional characters with the title of "viscount" or "viscountess".

Fictional viscount or viscountess	Work	Notes
Viscountess Adele von Ascham	Didn't I Say to Make My Abilities Average in the Next Life?!	Daughter of Viscount Ascham, she was to inherit the title after the conspiracy around her parents' assassinations was debunked but fled from her home country before she was given the title.
Raoul de Bragelonne	The d'Artagnan Romances	The Vicomte (Viscount) of Bragelonne.
Viscount Mabrey	The Princess Diaries 2: Royal Engagement	The antagonist who secretly plans to steal the crown.
Edmund, 8th Viscount Bridgerton	Bridgerton (novel series); The Viscount Who Loved Me; Bridgerton (TV series)	Characters in Julia Quinn's Regency romance novels and its Netflix adaptation Bridgerton
Violet, Dowager Viscountess Bridgerton	Bridgerton (novel series); The Viscount Who Loved Me; Bridgerton (TV series)	Characters in Julia Quinn's Regency romance novels and its Netflix adaptation Bridgerton
Anthony, 9th Viscount Bridgerton	Bridgerton (novel series); The Viscount Who Loved Me; Bridgerton (TV series)	Characters in Julia Quinn's Regency romance novels and its Netflix adaptation Bridgerton
Kate, Viscountess Bridgerton	Bridgerton (novel series); The Viscount Who Loved Me; Bridgerton (TV series)	Characters in Julia Quinn's Regency romance novels and its Netflix adaptation Bridgerton
Viscount Raoul de Chagny	The Phantom of the Opera	A childhood friend and love interest of Christine Daaé.
John Clayton II	Tarzan franchise	Viscount Greystoke. Raised by fictional ape species Mangani after the death of his birth parents, best known by his ape name "Tarzan."
Lady Dalrymple	Persuasion	A viscountess and a cousin of Sir Walter Elliot.
Viscount Marlowe Dumar	Dragon Age II	The ruler of the city-state of Kirkwall, in the Free Marches, beginning in the year 9:21 Dragon.
Griffith	Berserk	Was given the title by the King of Midland for his military prowess.
Viscount Hundro Moritani	Dune franchise, including Paul of Dune	The head of House Moritani.
Viscount Julian Alfred Pankratz	The Witcher franchise	The Viscount de Lettenhove, an old friend of Geralt, aka 'Jaskier'.

== Barons and baronesses ==
These are fictional characters with the title of "baron" or "baroness".

Fictional baron or baroness	Work	Notes
Baron Bedlam	DC Comics	His real name is Baron Frederick DeLamb. He is a supervillain from the fictional country of Markovia.
Baron and Baroness Bomburst	Chitty Chitty Bang Bang	The tyrants of the fictional country of Vulgaria and the main antagonists of the film.
Baroness von Bon Bon	Cuphead	One of the bosses that inhabit Inkwell Isle 2 in the level Sugarland Shimmy.
Baroness Anastasia Cisarovna	G.I. Joe: A Real American Hero	Referred to as "the Baroness", she is a villainess in the employ of Cobra.
Baron of Hell	Doom	High tier enemies, two are encountered at the end of Episode 1.
Baroness Rodmilla de Ghent	Ever After	The wicked stepmother of the film's heroine, Danielle de Barbarac.
Baroness Paula von Gunther	DC Comics	A supervillain and an enemy of Wonder Woman.
Baron Leo von Halkein	Guiding Light	Baron in Andorra. The ex-husband of Alexandra Spaulding and father of India von Halkein.
Baron Vladimir Harkonnen	Dune	The head of House Harkonnen and a main villain who is the arch-enemy of House Atreides.
Baron and Baroness Von Troken	Princess Diaries	A Noble family who once rule the Kingdom of Genovia.
Baroness von Hellman	Cruella	The noble fashion designer in the "House of Baroness" and the widowed mother of Cruella de Vil.
Admiral Lord Hornblower	Horatio Hornblower series	A Royal Navy officer during the Napoleonic Wars, made a knight of the Order of the Bath. Eventually created the Baron Hornblower of Smallbridge in the County of Kent.
Baron Matsunaga Tsuneyoshi	Memoirs of a Geisha	Mameha's danna, a baron (男爵, danshaku) in the Japanese nobility.
Baron Mordo	Marvel Comics	A Transylvanian nobleman and a supervillain.
Baron Munchausen	First appeared in Baron Munchausen's Narrative of his Marvellous Travels and Campaigns in Russia	A fictional German nobleman loosely based on the real historical baron Hieronymus Karl Friedrich, Freiherr von Münchhausen.
Porthos	The d'Artagnan Romances	Baron du Vallon de Bracieux de Pierrefonds. He is one of the three Musketeers.
Baron von Redberry	Baron von Redberry	Advertising mascot for "Baron von Redberry" breakfast cereal.
Herbert S. Sinclair	Blue Prince	The Baron of Mount Holly. By the end of the game, his grandnephew Simon P. Jones has inherited the title.
Baron Strucker	Marvel Comics	A supervillain and one of the leaders of Hydra.
Sir Roger, Baron de Tourneville	The High Crusade	A medieval English baron who captures an alien spacecraft and eventually gains a space empire.
Baron Klaus Wulfenbach	Girl Genius	A pan-European dictator and major antagonist of the comic.
Heinrich Zemo	Marvel Comics	The 12th Baron Zemo and a supervillain.
Helmut Zemo	Marvel Comics	The 13th Baron Zemo, the son of Heinrich Zemo, and a supervillain.

== Lords and ladies ==
These are fictional characters with the title of "lord" or "lady". A "lord" or "lady" can refer to a substantive title of peerage, a familiar title for one of the above formal titles, used as a courtesy title for a child of the above, or in recognition of a particular position or office that grants use of the title to the holder while they are acting in that role.

Fictional lord or lady	Work	Notes
Angrod	The Silmarillion	A lord of the Noldor.
The Seven Great Lords of Narnia	The Voyage of the Dawn Treader	The Lords Argoz, Bern, Mavramorn, Octesian, Restimar, Revilian, & Rhoop, the seven Lords exiled by Prince Caspian's uncle Miraz, and whom he allies with to regain the throne.
Lord Asriel	His Dark Materials	A member of the aristocracy in a parallel universe.
Elaine of Astolat	Arthurian legend	A lady from the castle of Astolat.
Petyr Baelish	A Song of Ice and Fire, Game of Thrones	A Machiavellian lord serving as the "Master of Coin" in Westeros.
Lady Bane	Disney's Adventures of the Gummi Bears	An evil witch and a recurring villain in the series. She is a love interest of Duke Igthorn.
Banquo	Macbeth	A general and an initial ally of Macbeth.
Cutler Beckett	Pirates of the Caribbean film series	A Lord and chairman of the East India Trading Company.
Midshipman Lord William Blakeney	Master and Commander: The Far Side of the World	The son of Captain Jack Aubrey's former shipmate, Captain Lord Narborough.
Roose Bolton	A Song of Ice and Fire, Game of Thrones	The Lord of the Dreadfort whose family has served as bannerman to the Starks and has designs on Winterfell itself.
Lady Catherine de Bourgh	Pride and Prejudice	The widow of Sir Lewis de Bourgh.
Bronn	A Song of Ice and Fire, Game of Thrones	A sellsword who allies with Tyrion to become the Lord of House Stokeworth.
Lord Buckethead	Inspired by a character in Hyperspace	A British satirical political candidate.
Oliver B. Bumble	Tom Puss, The Dragon That Wasn't (Or Was He?)	An anthropomorphic bear who is also a lord who lives in a castle.
Lord and Lady Byrne	Holby City	The parents of Joseph Byrne.
Grace Cavendish	Lady Grace Mysteries	A detective and a maid of honour of Queen Elizabeth I.
Celeborn	The Lord of the Rings, The Silmarillion, Unfinished Tales	Lord Celeborn and his wife Lady Galadriel are the co-rulers of the realm of Lothlórien.
Lara Croft	Tomb Raider	The daughter of Earl Richard Croft in the Tomb Raider video game and film franchise. Lord Croft was retconned from "Lord Henshingly Croft" to "Richard Croft, the Earl of Abingdon" in the 2001 film and 2006 video game.
Lord Covington	Madeline	A member of the board of trustees for a Catholic boarding school and a widower whose wife Lady Marie-Gilberte Covington was terminally ill.
Lady Penelope Creighton-Ward	Thunderbirds	The daughter of aristocrat Lord Hugh Creighton-Ward, a fashion model, and a secret agent.
Lord Darcy	Lord Darcy	A detective in an alternate history world.
Denethor	The Lord of the Rings	Lord and Steward of Gondor.
Lord Downey	Discworld	Head of the Assassins' Guild.
Lord Drinian	The Chronicles of Narnia	The captain of the Dawn Treader and an advisor and friend of King Caspian X.
Lord Dundreary	Our American Cousin	An idiotic English nobleman.
Elrond	The Hobbit, The Lord of the Rings, The Silmarillion, Unfinished Tales	The Lord of Rivendell.
Lady Claire of Eltham	Timeline	Also known as Lady Claire d'Eltham. She is the widow of a knight and owns lands in both England and France during the Hundred Years' War. Lady Claire is portrayed differently in the 2003 film adaptation, in which she is French instead of English, and is the sister of French commander Arnaut de Cervole.
Erkenbrand	The Two Towers	The Lord of the Westfold.
Jacqueline Falsworth	Marvel Comics	Jacqueline Falsworth, the daughter of Lord Falsworth, the first Union Jack. She is given a blood transfusion from the Human Torch and becomes Spitfire. Married Lord Crichton, entitling her to use the style Lady Crichton.
James Montgomery Falsworth	Marvel Comics	A retired country squire, the first of three superheroes to go by the name "Union Jack". Incorrectly styled as "Lord" if his brother Baron Blood inherited the title, should only be known as "The Honorable"
Lord Farquaad	Shrek	The ruler of Duloc and a main villain.
George Fox-Selwyn	Montmorency series	A wealthy British aristocrat, an undercover agent, and a friend of Montmorency.
Galadriel	The Lord of the Rings, The Silmarillion, Unfinished Tales	Lady Galadriel and her husband Lord Celeborn are the co-rulers of the realm of Lothlórien.
Lord Gast	The Chronicles of Prydain	A vassal of King Smoit and a rival of Lord Goryon.
Girion	The Hobbit	Lord of Dale during Smaug's attack on the city, and an ancestor of Bard the Bowman.
Lord Glenarvan	In Search of the Castaways, The Mysterious Island	A wealthy Scottish noble.
Lord Goryon	The Chronicles of Prydain	A vassal of King Smoit and a rival of Lord Gast.
John Grey	Outlander	As the second son of the Duke of Pardloe, entitled to use the title of Lord. A character in the Outlander franchise whom Jamie spares the life of during the Jacobite rising, later becomes a friend as governor of Ardsmuir Prison.
Lord Halewijn	Heer Halewijn	An evil magical being from Dutch folklore who enchants women with song and kills them.
Helspont	WildStorm, DC Comics	A High Lord of the Daemonites, and a supervillain.
Agatha Heterodyne	Girl Genius	The main protagonist of the comic, the Lady Heterodyne, and last of her family name.
Arthur Holmwood	Dracula	One of the protagonists hunting the vampire Count Dracula, who inherits his father's title of Lord Godalming halfway through the novel.
Lady Hideko Izumi	The Handmaiden	A Japanese heiress being courted by a conman operating under the sobriquet of "Count Fujiwara" in Japanese-occupied Korea.
Thierry of Janville	Thierry la Fronde	A young French lord who fights against the English occupation of France during the Hundred Years' War (a.k.a. "Thierry La Fronde").
Oscar François de Jarjayes	The Rose of Versailles	A woman who was raised as a male and is a French military commander before and during the French Revolution.
Lady Jessica	Dune	A Bene Gesserit, the concubine of Duke Leto Atreides, and the mother of Paul Atreides.
Lord Juss	The Worm Ouroboros	The chief lord of Demonland and the main hero of the story.
Lady Constance Keeble	Blandings stories	The sister of Lord Emsworth.
The Lady of the Lake	Arthurian legend	An enchantress who gives King Arthur the sword Excalibur.
Tywin Lannister	A Song of Ice and Fire, Game of Thrones	The Lord of Casterly Rock.
Lady Cornelia Locke	The English	The daughter of Lord Locke, Cornelia is an aristocratic Englishwoman who comes to the 19th century American West to seek revenge on the man responsible for the death of her son.
Lynette and Lyonesse	Arthurian legend	Noble sisters who travels to King Arthur's court to seek help.
Macduff	Macbeth	Lord Macduff is the Thane of Fife and the main protagonist in Shakespeare's Macbeth.
Mr. Majestic	WildStorm	Lord Majestros, one of four Kherubim lords trapped on Earth during the Kherubim/Daemonite war. He is also a superhero similar to Superman.
Lady Elaine Marsh-Morton	DC Comics	An English noblewoman who secretly works as an assassin, bounty hunter, mercenary, and antagonist of Nightwing. Frequently goes by the sobriquet of "Lady Vic" or "Lady Victim".
Lady Marian	Robin Hood	The heroine of the Robin Hood legends, frequently portrayed as rebellious highborn women who supports Robin Hood.
Olivia	Twelfth Night	A lady of noble birth who is at the center of the multiple plots of the play.
Jaina Proudmoore	Warcraft	The Lord Admiral and ruler of Kul Tiras.
George Alexander Pyke	Blandings stories	The Lord Tilbury of Tilbury House.
Lord John Roxton	The Lost World, The Poison Belt, The Land of Mist	An adventurer.
Lord Ruthven	The Vampyre	A fictional character, the antagonist in John William Polidori's "The Vampyre", and not in any way related to the real life Barons Ruthven in the Peerage of Scotland.
Lord Ryot	The Riot Club	An 18th century lord and student at Oxford, whose unfortunate demise results in the founding of a private dining club known for debauchery and excess, and continues today, when the film is set. A fictionalised version of the real life Bullingdon Club.
Eddard "Ned" Stark	A Song of Ice and Fire, Game of Thrones	Lord of Winterfell.
Lady Tremaine	Cinderella (1950 film)	The "Wicked Stepmother" of Cinderella in the Disney adaptation of the fairy tale.
Olenna Tyrell	A Song of Ice and Fire, Game of Thrones	Dowager Lady of Highgarden, and the matriarch of House Tyrell.
Lord Vader	Star Wars	A Jedi Knight who becomes a Dark Lord of the Sith and the main antagonist for much of the Star Wars film franchise, commonly styled as Darth Vader.
Lord Oliver de Vannes	Timeline	Also known as Sir Oliver. He is an English lord and knight based in France during the Hundred Years' War. He controls the castles Castelgard and La Roque.
Lord Wessex	Shakespeare in Love	An impoverished English lord seeking to marry the heiress Viola de Lesseps for her dowry. The real title of Earl of Wessex had been extinct by the time of Shakespeare, and created a second time for Prince Edward, in part due to the popularity of the film.

== Baronets and baronetesses ==
These are fictional characters with the title of "baronet" or "baronetess".

Fictional baronet or baronetess	Work	Notes
Sir Buckstone Abbott	Summer Moonshine	A baronet trying to sell his house.
Sir Anthony Absolute	The Rivals	A wealthy baronet and the father of Captain Jack Absolute.
Sir Michael Audley	Lady Audley's Secret	A wealthy middle-aged widower.
Sir Charles Baskerville	The Hound of the Baskervilles	A baronet who is found dead under mysterious circumstances.
Sir Henry Baskerville	The Hound of the Baskervilles	The nephew and heir of Sir Charles Baskerville.
Sir Paul Berowne	A Taste for Death	A former Minister of the Crown.
Sir Thomas Bertram	Mansfield Park	The uncle of Fanny Price.
Sir Percy Blakeney	The Scarlet Pimpernel	A wealthy English baronet who is secretly a hero known as the Scarlet Pimpernel who rescues French aristocrats from being executed during the French Revolution.
Sir Hilary Bray	On Her Majesty's Secret Service	A genealogist at the London College of Arms whom James Bond impersonates during a mission.
Sir Felix Carbury	The Way We Live Now	A young baronet and the son of Matilda, Lady Carbury.
Sir Clifford Chatterley	Lady Chatterley's Lover	The husband of Lady Constance Chatterley.
Sir Gervase Chevenix-Gore	Dead Man's Mirror	An elderly baronet who sent a letter summoning Hercule Poirot to his house, where Poirot finds his dead body.
Sir Robert Chiltern	An Ideal Husband	A member of the House of Commons.
Sir Francis Clavering	Pendennis	A member of Parliament and a gambler.
Sir Hugh Clavering	The Claverings	An affluent and selfish baronet.
Sir Pitt Crawley	Vanity Fair	A crude baronet whose oldest son is also called Pitt.
Sir George Crofts	Mrs. Warren's Profession	The business partner of Mrs. Kitty Warren.
Sir Leicester Dedlock	Bleak House	A conservative baronet.
Sir Walter Elliot	Persuasion	A vain baronet.
Sir Austin Feverel	The Ordeal of Richard Feverel	The father of Richard Feverel.
Sir Charles Fraith	Agatha Raisin	A friend of Agatha Raisin.
Sir Gilbert Galbraith (a.k.a. "Gibbie")	Sir Gibbie	A poor mute boy and the title character of the story.
Sir Percival Glyde	The Woman in White	The fiancé and later husband of Laura Fairlie.
Sir Julius Hanbury	"Ghost in the Machine" (an episode of Inspector Morse)	A baronet whose paintings have been stolen, and who is found dead.
Sir Julian Harker	Bodies	A wealthy stock speculator and founder of a social cult, which eventually seizes power in Britain.
Sir Hayden Harker	Bodies	The son and heir of Sir Julian Harker, and Commissioner of Scotland Yard.
Sir Topham Hatt ("The Fat Controller")	The Railway Series, Thomas & Friends	The Controller of the North Western Railway.
Sir Alan Lewrie	Alan Lewrie naval adventure series of novels	A captain in the Royal Navy during the late 18th and early 19th Centuries.
Sir Hugo Mallinger	Daniel Deronda	A wealthy gentleman, and the guardian of Daniel Deronda.
Sir William McCordle	Gosford Park	a wealthy industrialist and baronet, who hosts a weekend shooting party at his country estate.
Sir Despard Murgatroyd	Ruddigore	Sir Ruthven Murgatroyd's younger brother, who took the title of baronet believing that Ruthven was dead, but later transfers it to Ruthven once he finds out that Ruthven is alive.
Sir Ruthven Murgatroyd	Ruddigore	He starts out disguised as a farmer under the name "Robin Oakapple", but later accepts his rightful identity as a baronet.
Sir Gregory Parsloe	Blandings stories	The 7th Baronet, and a neighbor and rival of Lord Emsworth.
Sir Marmaduke Pointdextre	The Sorcerer	An elderly baronet and the father of Alexis Pointdextre.
Sir Ross Poldark	The Twisted Sword, a novel in the Poldark series	He becomes a baronet in this novel.
Sir Thomas Sharpe	Crimson Peak	An English baronet who travels with his sister, Lucille Sharpe, to the United States on a business trip.
Sir Robert Smithson	The French Lieutenant's Woman	The uncle of Charles Smithson.
Sir Anthony Strallan	Downton Abbey	A suitor of Lady Edith Crawley.
Sir Archie Strume	The Sixth Column: A Singular Tale of our Times	The tenth baronet of Antenor Hall, and Peter Fleming's chief protagonist in this spy novel.
Sir Perceval Stuyvesant	Wheels	A British baronet living in America, who is a close friend of Adam Trenton.
Sir Helmsley Thwarte	The Buccaneers	The father of Guy Thwarte.
Sir Dudley Valance	The Stranger's Child	The younger brother of Cecil Valance.
Sir Arthur Wardour	The Antiquary	A Scottish baronet.
Sir Percy Ware-Armitage	Those Magnificent Men in their Flying Machines	A British pilot who cheats in an air race.

== Knights and dames ==
These are fictional characters with the title of "knight" or "dame".

Fictional knight or dame	Work	Notes
Accolon	Arthurian legend	A knight who is tricked by Morgan le Fay into fighting against King Arthur.
Sir Andrew Aguecheek	Twelfth Night	A foolish knight.
Volker von Alzey	Nibelungenlied	A knight and minstrel.
Humphrey Appleby	Yes Minister, Yes, Prime Minister	The Permanent Secretary for the Department of Administrative Affairs.
Sir Arthur	Ghosts 'n Goblins	The primary protagonist in the video game series.
Solaire of Astora	Dark Souls	A knight
Sir Bagby	Sir Bagby	A knight and the title character of the comic strip.
Sir Balin	Arthurian legend	A knight of King Arthur's court before the Round Table existed.
Bedivere	Arthurian legend	A Knight of the Round Table.
Sir Toby Belch	Twelfth Night	The uncle of Olivia.
Black Knight	Monty Python and the Holy Grail	A knight whom King Arthur fights to cross a bridge.
Black Knight (Sir Percy)	Marvel Comics	Sir Percy of Scandia is the original Black Knight who serves King Arthur.
Bradamante	Orlando Innamorato, Orlando Furioso	A female knight, and the sister of Rinaldo. She marries Ruggiero.
Dame Beatrice Adela Lestrange Bradley	Mrs Bradley series of novels, The Mrs Bradley Mysteries	A detective who eventually becomes a dame.
Sir Cawline	Sir Cawline	A knight who has to do a great deed to marry a king's daughter.
Ser Gregor Clegane	A Song of Ice and Fire, Game of Thrones	An extremely large knight.
Dagonet	Arthurian legend	A Knight of the Round Table, and a jester.
Dame Edna Everage	The Dame Edna Experience and others	A comedy character played by Australian comedian Barry Humphries. She receives her damehood in the film Barry McKenzie Holds His Own.
Falstaff	Henry IV, Part 1, Henry IV, Part 2, The Merry Wives of Windsor	A fat knight who socializes with criminals, and a companion of Prince Hal.
Harry Flashman	Tom Brown's School Days, The Flashman Papers	Originally a school bully, he becomes a Victorian soldier who pretends to be brave, but is really a lying coward. He receives his knighthood in Flashman in the Great Game.
Green Knight	Arthurian legend	His real name is Bertilak de Hautdesert. He wears green clothing and tests other knights.
Griflet	Arthurian legend	A Knight of the Round Table.
Sir Kay	Arthurian legend	The foster brother of King Arthur, the son of Sir Ector, and a Knight of the Round Table.
Knights Who Say "Ni!"	Monty Python and the Holy Grail	A group of knights who shout "Ni!" to force travelers to give them what they want.
Suzaku Kururugi	Code Geass	A member of the Knights of the Round.
Ser Jaime Lannister	A Song of Ice and Fire, Game of Thrones	A knight of the Kingsguard.
Brigadier Lethbridge-Stewart	Doctor Who	Brigadier Sir Alistair Gordon Lethbridge-Stewart is one of the founding commanders of UNIT and primarily worked with the Third Doctor during his exile on earth, but has been featured with the Second, Fourth, Fifth, and Seventh Doctors. He was knighted sometime between the Seventh and Tenth Doctors where his is referred to as Sir Alistair and confirmed during his appearance in The Sarah Jane Adventures.
Sir Ulrich von Liechtenstein	A Knight's Tale	The fictional name the squire William Thatcher uses to enter jousting contests after his master, Sir Ector dies, leaving his retinue unemployed. He is eventually knighted as Sir William in his own right by the Black Prince.
Magic Knight	Finders Keepers, Spellbound, Knight Tyme, Stormbringer	A video game character.
Meta Knight	Kirby	A mysterious but honorable knight.
Renaud de Montauban	Matter of France	A son of Duke Aymon.
Ser Jorah Mormont	A Song of Ice and Fire, Game of Thrones	A knight in exile.
Sir Les Patterson	Numerous appearances, including in The Dame Edna Experience, The Dame Edna Treatment, and Les Patterson Saves the World	A rude comedy character who received a knighthood. He is played by Australian comedian Barry Humphries.
Harry Pearce	Spooks, Spooks: The Greater Good	The head of the counter-terrorism department of MI5.
Pelleas	Arthurian legend	A Knight of the Round Table.
Sir Hokus of Pokes	First appears in The Royal Book of Oz, and goes on to appear in later Oz books.	An elderly knight.
Austin Powers	Austin Powers	A hippie-like British spy. He is knighted in the film Austin Powers in Goldmember.
Johan, De Rode Ridder (Johan, the Red Knight)	De Rode Ridder	A lonely travelling knight.
Floris van Roozemond	Floris	A 16th-century Dutch knight.
Ser Davos Seaworth	A Song of Ice and Fire, Game of Thrones	A landed knight.
Shining Knight (Sir Justin)	DC Comics	Sir Justin is the first of three superheroes known as Shining Knight. He was one of King Arthur's knights before being frozen and waking up in the modern world.
Shovel Knight	Shovel Knight	A knight armed with a shovel.
Silent Knight	DC Comics	His real name is Brian Kent. He is the son of Sir Edwin, a feudal lord.
Lord Soth	Dragonlance	A death knight and a former Knight of Solamnia.
Brienne of Tarth	A Song of Ice and Fire, Game of Thrones	A female knight.
Capitán Trueno	Capitán Trueno comic book series	A 12th-century knight-errant.
The White Knight	Through the Looking-Glass	A knight who helps Alice.
Dane Whitman	Marvel Comics	The Black Knight of the Modern Era.
Link	The Legend of Zelda	In Breath of the Wild, Link is a knight, like his father.

== Lairds ==
These are fictional characters with the title of "laird".

Fictional laird	Work	Notes
Destro	G.I. Joe franchise	His full name is Laird James McCullen Destro XXIV. He is a terrorist and weapons supplier for Cobra.
Jamie Fraser	Outlander	Laird of Broch Tuarach.
Archie MacDonald	Monarch of the Glen	Laird of Glenbogle.
Hector MacDonald	Monarch of the Glen	Laird of Glenbogle before his son Archie MacDonald receives the title.
Paul Bowman-MacDonald	Monarch of the Glen	He becomes Laird of Glenbogle after his half-brother Archie MacDonald moves to New Zealand.
Jonathan Oldbuck	The Antiquary	The Laird of Monkbarns.
Fergus McDuck	DuckTales (2017)	Laird of Castle McDuck, father of plutocrat Scrooge McDuck.

== Esquires/squires ==
These are fictional characters with the title of "esquire" or "squire". (This is not a title of nobility. The word "Esq." was historically used to address letters to any man, and has no connotations of rank at all.)

Fictional esquire/squire	Work	Notes
Squire Allworthy	The History of Tom Jones, a Foundling	A wealthy squire and the guardian of Tom Jones.
Mr. Bennet	Pride and Prejudice	An esquire and the patriarch of the Bennet family.
The Squire	The Canterbury Tales	The son and squire of the Knight.
Squire John Trelawney	Treasure Island	A landowner who participates in the expedition to find the treasure.
Squire Western	The History of Tom Jones, a Foundling	A wealthy squire and a huntsman.

== Gentry ==
These are fictional characters who do not have titles, nor are they noble, but do have aristocratic descent.

Fictional noble	Work	Notes
Captain Haddock	The Adventures of Tintin	A mariner descendant of a French privateer.
Desmond Miles	Assassin's Creed	A modern Assassin who is descended from the House of Auditore, an Italian Renaissance-era noble family from Florence, and the Kenway family, an 18th-century British noble family.
Captain Ross Poldark	Poldark	A British Army veteran of the American Revolutionary War, who returns to his home in Cornwall to find that his father has died, leaving his estate in ruins.
Christopher Tietjens	Parade's End	"The last Tory", a second son of a wealthy landowning family who serves in the British Army during the First World War.
Bruce Wayne	DC Comics	Bruce Wayne is descended from the medieval Scottish nobility and Arthuric linage.

== Other nobility ==
Other fictional aristocratic characters that do not have the above titles nor ennobled in the western tradition.

Fictional noble	Work	Notes
Ezio Auditore da Firenze	Assassin's Creed	An Italian noble and Assassin from the fictional House of Auditore.
Toph Beifong	Avatar: The Last Airbender	A skilled earthbender born into the noble Beifong family.
Bluebeard	"Bluebeard"	A nobleman who is also a serial killer.
Petra Chérie	Petra Chérie	Also known as Petra de Karlowitz. She is a young adventurous Franco-Polish noblewoman.
Jedah Dohma	Darkstalkers	A nobleman of the demonic dimension of Makai.
Arno Dorian	Assassin's Creed	A French-Austrian Assassin and member of a minor noble family prior to the French Revolution.
Elionor	Cathedral of the Sea	A Spanish noblewoman.
Ignis Dustiness Ford	KonoSuba	A prominent noble and the father of one of the main characters.
Lalatina "Darkness" Dustiness Ford	KonoSuba	A secondary main character who became a crusader against her father Ignis' wishes.
Hannibal Lecter	First appears in Thomas Harris' Red Dragon series	The son of a Lithuanian count as revealed in Hannibal Rising.
Edward Kenway	Assassin's Creed	A Welsh pirate-turned-Assassin who attains nobility status after settling down in London.
Haytham Kenway	Assassin's Creed	A British nobleman and Templar who is the son of Edward Kenway.
Byakuya Kuchiki	Bleach	The head of the noble Kuchiki clan.
Alonso Quixano (Don Quixote)	Don Quixote	A hidalgo (Spanish noble) who wants to become a knight-errant and renames himself Don Quixote.
Ramón Salazar	Resident Evil series	A feudal lord of a rural remnant of the Spanish Ancient Regime.
Vega	Street Fighter	A fighter who was born into a noble Spanish family.
Don Diego de la Vega	Zorro series	A Spanish lord who is secretly the masked vigilante known as Zorro.
Onufry Zagłoba	The Trilogy	A lesser Polish noble.

== Samurai ==
These are fictional characters with the title of "samurai", a Japanese title of warrior nobility similar to "knight".

Fictional samurai	Work	Notes
John Blackthorne	Shōgun	An English sailor who travels to Japan and is given the titles of samurai and hatamoto based on the real life story of William Adams.
Date Masamune	Sengoku Basara	A fictional samurai loosely based on the real historical figure Date Masamune.
Jack Fletcher	Young Samurai	An English boy shipwrecked in Japan who eventually becomes a samurai.
Gintoki Sakata	Gin Tama	A samurai who works as a freelancer.
Haohmaru	Samurai Shodown	A fictional rōnin based on the real historical figure Miyamoto Musashi.
Miyamoto Usagi	Usagi Yojimbo, as well as other media, including Teenage Mutant Ninja Turtles related media	An anthropomorphic rabbit samurai who eventually becomes a rōnin after the death of his lord.
Kuroda Jubei	Red Sun	The fish out of water protagonist foil to Charles Bronson's Link Stuart, both seeking Alain Delon's Gauche in the 1971 Spaghetti Western by Terence Young.
Lord Katsumoto Moritsugu	The Last Samurai	The leader of a samurai rebellion who is based on the real historical figure Saigō Takamori.
Myōjin Yahiko	Rurouni Kenshin	An orphan from a samurai family who eventually becomes a samurai himself.
Nemuri Kyōshirō	Nemuri Kyōshirō	A rōnin.
Samurai Cat	"Samurai Cat" book series, beginning with The Adventures of Samurai Cat	Also known as Miaowara Tomokato. He is an anthropomorphic cat warrior who formerly served Oda Nobunaga, and subsequently seeks to avenge his master's death.
Samurai Futaba	Saturday Night Live	A comedy sketch character.
Samurai Jack	Samurai Jack	The protagonist of the Cartoon Network series of the same name, wields a magic sword to defeat the demon Aku. Real name is unknown, uses "Jack" as a pseudonym. Son of an also unnamed Emperor of Japan.
Sanada Yukimura	Sengoku Basara	A fictional samurai loosely based on the real historical figure Sanada Yukimura.
Tōyama no Kin-san	Various works	A fictional samurai based on the real historical figure Tōyama Kagemoto.
Toranaga Yoshi	Shōgun	A fictional daimyō of Japan based on the real historical figure Tokugawa Ieyasu.
Yamada Asaemon	Samurai Executioner	A rōnin who works as a sword-tester and executioner.
Yasuke	Yasuke	An alternate-reality anime series loosely based on the historical figure of the same name.

== See also ==
- List of fictional monarchs (fictional countries)
- List of fictional princes
- List of fictional princesses
