= Video game preservation =

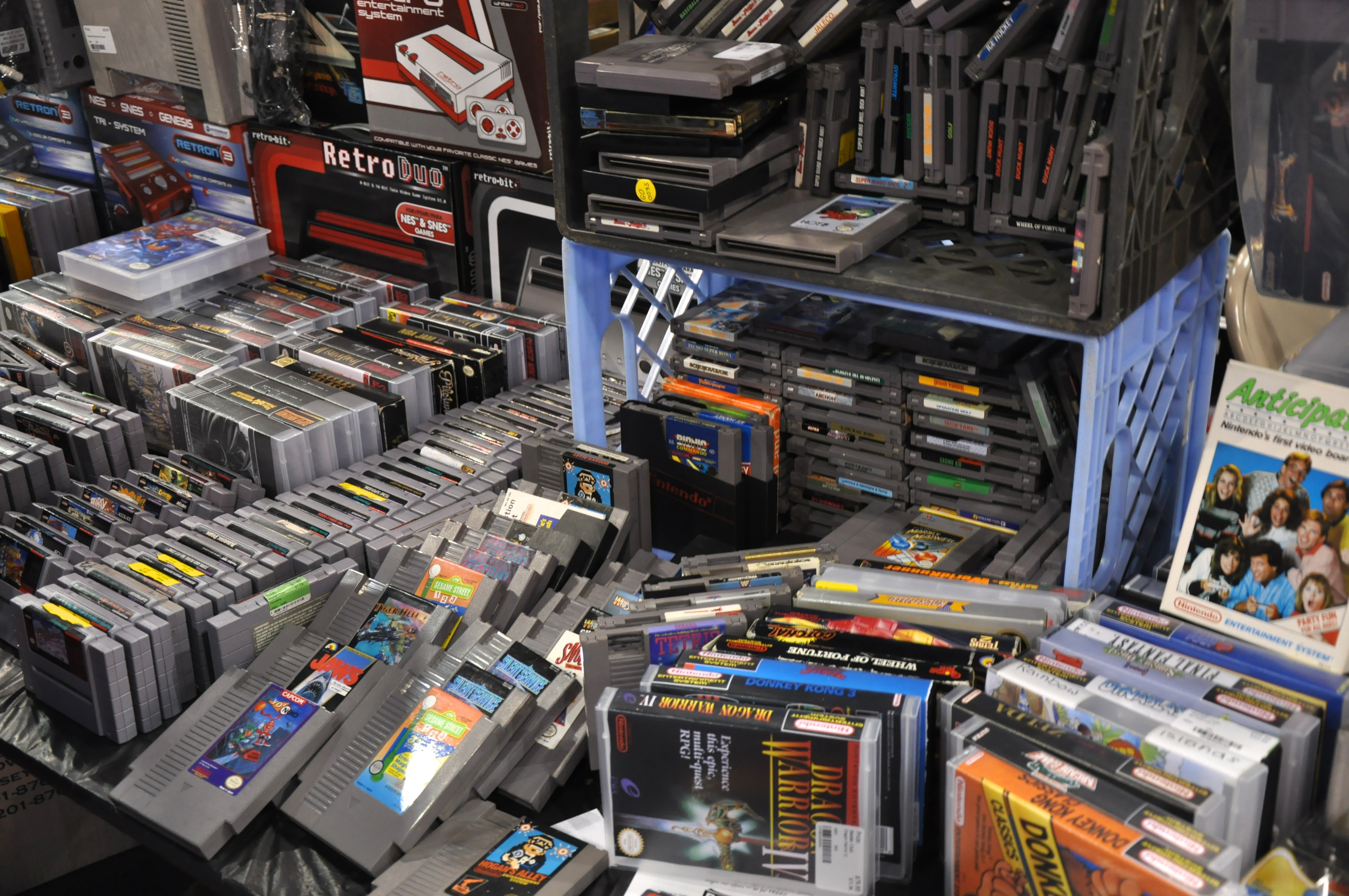
Video game preservation seeks to preserve games from a wide variety of game systems, including those no longer in production.

Video game preservation is a form of preservation applied to the video game industry that includes, but is not limited to, digital preservation. Such preservation efforts include archiving development source code and art assets, digital copies of video games, emulation of video game hardware, maintenance and preservation of specialized video game hardware such as arcade games and video game consoles, and digitization of print video game magazines and books prior to the Digital Revolution.

== Importance of preservation ==
Besides retaining the ability to play games from the past, preservation of video games enables research on the history of video games as well as ways for developers to look at older games to build ideas from. There is also interest in the preservation of cancelled video games that were known to be in development, as coupled with the reasons for cancellation, they can provide an understanding of the technical and creative aspects, or lack thereof, at the time of the game's development.

Unlike some examples of other forms of media like books, art and photography, and film, which antedate the mid-20th century and which can be preserved in a variety of formats that are not prohibited by more-recent intellectual property (IP) laws, video games typically require specialized and/or proprietary computer hardware and software to read and execute game software. However, as technology advances, these older game systems become obsolete, no longer produced nor maintained to use for executing games. The media formats of the early days of computer gaming, relying on floppy discs and CD-ROMs, suffer from disc rot and degrade over time, making it difficult to recover information. Further, video games tend to rely on other resources like operating systems, network connectivity, and external servers outside control of users, and making sure these boundary aspects to a video game are preserved along with the game are also essential.

According to a 2023 study by the Video Game History Foundation (VGHF), 87% of video games released in the United States before 2010 (at the onset of digital distribution) have been lost or are at risk of being lost due to lack of video game preservation due to the difficulties involved. One period of the video game industry that has received a great deal of attention is up through the 1980s. Games prior to the mid-1980s have been compared to the silent era for films, where much of the gameplay and language of video games was established. Yet, as a result of the video game crash of 1983, many companies involved in developing games folded or were acquired by other companies. In this process, the source code for many games prior to the crash were lost or destroyed, leaving only previously sold copies of games on their original format as evidence of their existence. Even of companies that survived the crash, long-term planning towards preservation was not always a consideration. Both Nintendo and Sega are considered part of the few companies from this period known to have actively worked to backup and retain their games, even those that were cancelled or unreleased, over time.

Code and assets can be lost during consolidation of companies or similar business activities; for example the assets for the 1997 Blade Runner game were lost when Electronic Arts had physically moved Westwood Studios following their acquisition, making it difficult for Night Dive Studios to attempt a remaster of the game around 2020. Another example includes the original code and art asset files for Starcraft (1998), which were lost during the development for StarCraft: Remastered. As a result, the sprites had to be redone from scratch. Physical archives of older game material can also be suspectible to losses when companies clear out or consolidate offices. Several Japanese developers that were first founded in the 1980s and 1990s, including Square Enix, Capcom, Taito and Sega, have committed their own internal efforts to keep physical archives in special locations to prevent accidental disposal while also working to digitize these assets. The rights to older games have also defaulted to persons that may have been tangentially involved with the game and are unaware of their rights' ownership. In one case GOG.com stated they had to hire a private investigator to locate such a rights-holder for games they wanted to preserve that was otherwise living off the grid.

Preservation also has become an issue with the prevalence of digital distribution on console platforms; as manufacturers drop support for older hardware, games that exist only in digital form may be lost. This issue came to light when Sony Interactive Entertainment announced plans to shut down storefronts for the PlayStation 3, PlayStation Portable and PlayStation Vita by mid-2021, though which Sony later reversed, leaving the PlayStation 3 and Vita stores open indefinitely, while limiting PlayStation Portable purchases to the Vita and PlayStation 3 storefronts. An estimated 2,200 games across these platforms were only available digitally, and while most have versions on other platforms, about 120 were exclusive to the Sony platform and would become completely unavailable after the stores' closure. Prior to reversing their decision, Sony did not provide any immediate plans to offer these titles by other means. In 2022, Sony started its own preservation team, which by March 2025, had saved over 1,000 builds (including alpha and beta builds in addition to releases) available by various means on the PlayStation 5, including source code and art assets. Sony later announced plans to shutter these storefronts by July 2027.

Nintendo faced similar concerns when they announced plans to shutter the Nintendo eShop for the Wii U and Nintendo 3DS by March 2023, which would remove around 1,000 digital-only games from availability. While some games available digitally are also offered in a physical retail product, the contents of the physical product may only be a portion of the game or a redemption key for a digital storefront. Additionally, digital games may be reliant on middleware solutions from third parties that may have gone out of business, making it near impossible to recover the full game even if the game developer has full source code available. Even preservation of non-commercial games have drawn attention. Ahead of the discontinuation of the Adobe Flash plugin in 2020, sites like the Internet Archive took steps to develop a secure sandbox version of Flash and archived thousands of free Flash games that had been made over the previous two decades.

Further, during the ninth generation of video game consoles, there was a further shift to eliminate physical media copies of games and distributing solely via digital storefronts. Sony announced in 2026 it will stop shipping its PlayStation games on physical media by January 2028. In addition to the difficulties of preserving digital games, the move was seen as anti-consumer and could potentially hurt retailers and publishers.

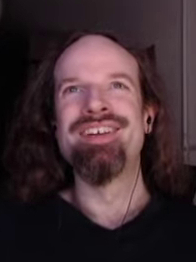
Ross Scott, who started Stop Killing Games.

An additional challenge are games that receive frequent updates that can change the nature of the game over time, such as those offered as games as a service such as MMOs and mobile games. These games also face issues when the supporting servers are shut down by the publisher or developer; unless the game is updated to split off the server dependencies, such as the case for Kingdom Hearts χ, these games become unplayable and lost to preservationists. While preservationists can attempt to get copies of all intermediate states of a game, the use of video from gamers playing over streaming services has become more valuable to showcase the intermediate state of those games. Preservation of server-based games can still leave legal issues around copyright as a concern to the original game owner; for example, Atlus filed a lawsuit in late 2021 against players that had recreated the servers and client software for the defunct Shin Megami Tensei: Imagine, claiming the fan-run project "caused and will continue to cause irreparable damage to Atlus". In the wake of Ubisoft's shuttering of the servers for The Crew, an initiative called Stop Killing Games, led by Ross Scott, the creator of Freeman's Mind, was launched in 2024 to urge companies to either stop shutting down services for live games or assure they are still playable if the game's servers are shuttered. This has generally received higher focus in the European Union countries, where there are more protection for consumers.

Preservation has become a greater priority for game companies since the 2000s with the ease of redundant digital storage solutions, and thus tends not to be an issue for games issued since that point. Frank Cifaldi, director of the Video Game History Foundation, said that Electronic Arts had developed an extensive means of preserving their games at the end of the development cycle, and had contacted former employees to collect data and assets from past games to help preserve their titles. However, full game preservation for larger publishers and developers can be expensive for all but their best-selling titles.

== Legal issues ==
Most issues related to video game preservation are based on the United States, one of the largest markets for video games, and as such, issues related to preservation are limited by laws of the country.

While there has been significant effort to overcome issues related to old and abandoned hardware, access to older games still remains a critical issue. The Video Game History Foundation, in 2023, reported on the lack of commercial availability of games from older systems that threatens preservation efforts. For example, the Commodore 64, considered one of the key systems in popularizing computer-based games in the United States, was estimated to have in 2023 only 4.5% of the 1800 games that had been published for it during its lifetime. A similar low percentage was found for the family of Game Boy handheld consoles. Because of the lack of legal commercial routes to obtain older titles, some users resort to copyright violations to obtain these titles. In general, the copying and distribution of video games that are under copyright without authorization is considered a copyright violation (often called as software piracy). However, it has generally been tolerated that users may make archival copies of software (including video games) as long as they own the original software; if the user sells or loses the original software in any way, they must destroy the archival copies. This is also justification for a person being able to make ROM images from game cartridges that they own.

In 1998, the United States Congress passed the Digital Millennium Copyright Act (DMCA), designed to bring copyright within the United States to align with two doctrines published by the World Intellectual Property Organization in 1996. The DMCA make it a criminal offense to develop, sell, or use technologies that are designed to bypass anti-circumvention devices, including software digital rights management (DRM) used in various forms of media. This subsequently made it illegal to backup up one's software for many games distributed via either game cartridge or optical disc, if some form of DRM was used to limit access to the software on the media.

The Library of Congress is responsible to open submissions for specific and narrow exemptions from interested parties every three years, and determine which of those, if any, to grant. Through the Library of Congress, some key exceptions to the DMCA have been granted to allow for video game preservation.

- In the 2003 set of exemptions, the Library disallowed enforcement of the DMCA for "computer programs protected by dongles that prevent access due to malfunction or damage and which are obsolete" and for "computer programs and video games distributed in formats that have become obsolete and which require the original media or hardware as a condition of access".
- In the 2015 exemptions, the Library granted permission for preservationists to work around copy-protection in games which required an authentication step with an external server that was no longer online prior to playing the game which otherwise did not require online connectivity; this specifically did not cover games that were based on a server-client mode like most massively-multiplayer online games (MMOs). The exemption included the use of emulators and other computer programs that would be required to play the game on available systems.
- In the 2018 exemptions, the Library allowed for preservation and fair use of server-based games like MMOs, permitting preservationists to offer such games where they have legally obtained the game's code within museums and libraries.

The DMCA exemptions do not mean all ROM images are legal, and concern about continuing video game preservation was raised in mid-2018, after Nintendo initiated a lawsuit against two websites that distributed ROMs for games from their older platforms. The Copyright Office has also not approved all such DMCA exemption requests; in 2024, it rejected an exemption proposed by the VGHF and Software Preservation Network that would have allowed video game museums and similar archives to be able to bypass copyright as to allow games to be made available remotely to researchers.

Though video game emulation has generally been deemed legal, actions taken from video game hardware manufacturers against the developers of emulations that fall outside legal allowances have removed these emulations from availability, which in turn raises questions of preservation of games usable on those emulators. In 2024, Nintendo sued the team behind the Nintendo Switch emulator, Yuzu, over issues related to decryption keys and enabling the widespread distribution of a leaked version of The Legend of Zelda: Tears of the Kingdom before its retail release. While Nintendo and the Yuzu team settled, the settlement prevented the team from engaging in further activities related to emulation, forcing the team to remove their earlier Nintendo 3DS emulator, Citra. Being the only Nintendo 3DS emulator at the time, and after Nintendo had shuttered the 3DS eShop, preservationists worried about being able to study these 3DS titles in the future.

Normal copyright laws and contractual agreements may also hamper legitimate preservation efforts. These can sometimes take years to resolve. The 1997 GoldenEye 007 game for Nintendo 64 had established some early principles of multiplayer first person shooters, and attempts to port or remaster the game had started as early as 2006. It took until about 2023 for the rights between all property owners—Nintendo, Rare, Metro-Goldwyn-Mayer, Eon Productions, and Danjaq LLC along with Microsoft—to secure a rerelease. The 2000 game The Operative: No One Lives Forever and its sequel are considered to be in copyright limbo due to subsequent business moves that dispersed where the IP may have gone: the games were developed by Monolith Productions which after publication became a subsidiary of Warner Bros. Interactive Entertainment. The games' publisher was Sierra Entertainment, which had been owned by Fox Interactive, a subsidiary of 20th Century Fox, but later sold to Vivendi Games; Vivendi Games itself eventually was merged into Activision Blizzard. Around 2014, Nightdive Studios, a company with interest in reviving old games, had spent significant time working between Warner Bros., Fox, and Activision to try to track down the ownership of the game's IP but none of the three companies had immediate knowledge of the IP's state, and did not see the value in searching their paper archives to find the required documents, particularly in the case of jointly owned IP.

Further hampering preservation issues is the fact that most video game development are made as work for hire products, with the ownership kept by the company that hires the video game developers rather than with the developer themselves. Many developers have kept some or all of the game's code they have worked on, but typically cannot release this due to their employment contracts and because their employer owns that copyright. For example, Tim Cain, the lead developer of the first Fallout, said he was forced by his company Interplay Productions to destroy all of his personal copies of the game's code, assets, and development material after he left the studio, under the claim that the company would preserve it, later only to learn that the company had since lost that material. Rebecca Heineman, who helped to port Fallout to Macintosh computers, said she had been able to keep copies of the code, knowing of Interplay's policies but had not feared any repercussions from the company. Some developers, after enough time has passed, have released their code to preservation efforts despite not owning the copyright directly, on the basis that the value of preservation would outweigh the impact on copyright.

== Preservation of video game software ==
=== Emulation ===
Video game console emulators use software that replicates the hardware environment of a video-game console, arcade machine, or specific PC architecture. Generally these create a virtual machine on newer computer systems that simulate the key processing units of the original hardware. The emulators then can read in software, such as a ROM image for arcade games or cartridge-based systems, or the game's optical media disc or an ISO image of that disc, to play the game in full.

Emulation has been used in some official capacity on newer consoles. Nintendo's Virtual Console allowed games from its earlier consoles and other third-parties to be played on the Wii, Wii U, and 3DS. Some games can only be played in this way, such as the 2nd generation of Pokémon games. Nintendo's Virtual Console was shut down for the Wii on January 30, 2019, and for the 3DS and Wii U on March 27, 2023. Previously purchased titles remain playable. Sony had originally released the PlayStation 3 with backwards compatibility with PlayStation 1 and PlayStation 2 games if players had the original media, but have transitioned to selling emulated games in its PlayStation Store as well as offering the PlayStation Now cloud gaming service that allows PlayStation 3 games to be played on other devices including the PlayStation 4, PlayStation 5 and compatible personal computers. Microsoft has created a backwards compatibility program through emulation to allow selected Xbox titles to be played on the Xbox 360, and similarly another program for certain Xbox and Xbox 360 titles to be played on the Xbox One and Xbox Series X and Series S if they own the original game, and have made some of these titles available for purchase via digital distribution through Xbox Live. Former console hardware companies such as Sega and Atari have released emulation-based collections of their games for multiple systems.

In the PC space, emulation of either a game engine or full operating system are available. In these cases, players are expected to own copies of the game to use the content files. DOSBox emulates a complete IBM PC compatible operating system allowing most games for older computers to be run on modern systems. Emulators also exist for older arcade games, such as MAME.

Head of Xbox Game Studios Phil Spencer has also suggested that cloud gaming can help with emulation and preservation, as on the server backend for cloud gaming, more technical resources can be offered to support emulation in a manner that appears transparent to the end user. Spencer said "My hope (and I think I have to present it that way as of now) is as an industry we'd work on legal emulation that allowed modern hardware to run any (within reason) older executable allowing someone to play any game." Sony has made cloud emulation of select original PlayStation, PlayStation 2, PlayStation 3 and PlayStation Portable available to member in certain tiers of the subscription-based PlayStation Network service.

There are legalities related to emulation that can make it difficult to preserve video games in this manner. First, the legality of creating an emulator itself is unclear. Several United States case laws, such as Sony Computer Entertainment, Inc. v. Connectix Corp. (2000), have shown that developing emulation is a legal activity as long as no proprietary information or copyrighted code is incorporated into the emulation. This generally requires that the emulator be developed through reverse engineering in a clean room design, using only publicly released information about the system. Once completed, emulators need access to a game's ROM image or even a console's BIOS image. While acquiring a copy of a ROM or BIOS by dumping from a console one owns for one's own use falls within fair use, obtaining and distributing ROM and BIOS images from other parties are recognized as copyright violations.

=== Migration ===
Migration refers to re-releasing software from one platform to a newer platform, otherwise keeping all the gameplay, narrative, and art assets the same. This can be done through a few routes:

- Game engine recreation: A new universal game engine can be developed that uses the original game assets but otherwise runs on any future hardware platform. Such examples include the Z-machine for many of the Infocom text adventure games, and the ScummVM allows players to run nearly every LucasArts adventure game.
- Software re-compilation or porting: The original source code for the game is re-compiled for a newer platform, making necessary changes to work on the newer hardware. This requires that the source code for the original game is available for this purpose. Many of the games published by Digital Eclipse are based on decompiling of the original game's code with approval of the copyright owner into their own Eclipse engine which allows for porting to any number of systems.
- Decompilation and recreation. In instances where only executable files are available without source code, some developers have attempted to decompile the executable to generate elements of source code, which then is used to build updated versions on newer platforms. This is more seen as a challenge by those that engage in the practice. There are legal questions around obtaining and decompiling executable files without approval, leading questions to the practice and dissemination of the new source code. In 2026, with advancements in AI and large-language models, AI models were able to perform decompiling and generation of new portable source code, leading to a decline of this practice by human developers.

=== Abandonware ===
Abandonware refers to software that may still be capable of running on modern computers or consoles, but the developer or publisher has either disappeared, no longer sell the product, or no longer operate servers necessary for running the software, among other cases. Examples include Freelancer (as its publisher went out of business) and Black & White (due to the closure of the development studio). The aforementioned No One Lives Forever is considered such a case due to the lack of interest of the known likely-rights holders to affirm their ownership and work out licensing arrangements for rerelease.

Because of the lack of availability of any legal retail route to purchase the case, these games may be offered at no cost by some websites, such as Home of the Underdogs, typically with necessary patches to remove copyright protection and updates to play on newer systems. Legally, such software still falls under normal copyright laws, making this practice illegal. Copyright only disappears over time depending on its copyright term (from 75 to 90 years for most video games), and even with shuttered companies, the copyright is an asset that often becomes owned by the liquidator of the closed company. Normally it would be up to the copyright owner to seek legal action, and with shuttered developers and publishers, this often did not happen, but since around 1999, video game trade organizations like the Entertainment Software Association have stepped in to take direct action against sites as representatives for all of its members.

Under the DMCA, the Copyright Office has made exceptions since 2015 for allowing museums and other archivists to bypass copyright issues to get such software into a playable state, a new exception seeks to allow this specifically for multiplayer games requiring servers, specifically massively-multiplayer online games.

=== Mods and recreations ===
In some cases, fans of a video game have helped to preserve the game to the best of their abilities without access to source code, even though the copyright nature of these fan projects are highly contentious, and more so when monetary issues are involved. Games like Star Wars: Knights of the Old Republic II and Vampire: The Masquerade – Bloodlines, which had difficult production issues before release, may leave unused assets to be found by players, and in the case of both these games, players have developed unofficial patches that work to complete the content, in some cases, exceeding expectations of the original content creators. Remakes of games to modern platforms or game engines may also be led through fan efforts. Black Mesa is a fan-based remake of the first Half-Life game from Valve Corporation, but enhancing the game's assets from the original GoldSrc game engine to the newer Source engine, with Valve's blessing for the effort.

=== Databases ===
Video game databases have been created to track historical video games, particularly those from the early days of the industry which have become forgotten. Sites like MobyGames and IGDB. Home of the Underdogs remains a database of early computer games after the site eliminated its abandonware offerings.

=== Others ===
Source code for older games, before rights were strongly controlled by publishers, were often kept by the programmers themselves, and they may release those, or may be part of their estate after death. In one case, a lost Nintendo Entertainment System game, an earlier version of Days of Thunder by Chris Oberth, who had died in 2012, was recovered from source code on floppy discs from his work materials in 2020 by the Video Game History Foundation with permission of his family.

Preservation of video game software has come through dubious routes. The source code for all of the Infocom text adventure games had been obtained by Jason Scott in 2008 via an anonymous user in the "Infocom drive", an archive file that represented the entirety of the Infocom's main server days prior to the company's relocation from Massachusetts to California in 1989. While Scott was aware this was akin to industrial espionage, he still had published the source code for the games for purposes of preservation. John Hardie of the National Videogame Museum had gone dumpster diving through the trash of shutdown companies to recover materials for his collection.

Though illegal in most jurisdictions, video game piracy is a possible route to preservation. In wake of Sony's decision to forgo physical media by January 2028, Cifaldi said that piracy is that "only extant form of media preservation that exists in games right now", as they had tried to work with video game publishers to provide a legal path to preserving digital-only games, but have met resistance to their efforts, leaving piracy as a serious option.

== Preservation of video game hardware ==
While in most cases, digitizing the software for video games is sufficient for preservation, there have been enough unique consoles with limited production runs that can create further challenges for video game preservation as it is difficult to emulate its software. When hardware is in ready supply, white-hat hackers and programmers can freely tear-down these systems to analyze their internals for reverse engineering for preservation, but when systems are in limited supply, such tactics are not appropriate. These systems can also degrade as well. More often, broken or non-functional versions of older hardware can be acquired to demonstrate that such systems existed, but fail to work as a software preservation tool. For example, the only known unit of the Super NES CD-ROM, a Sony-produced Super Nintendo Entertainment System prototype with a CD-ROM drive, was carefully repaired to be able to use the CD-ROM so that some functionality of its software could be verified and allow the few known software titles to be tested on it. Prior to the discovery of the prototype, it was found out that an estimated 200 units were produced before Sony and Nintendo's deal changed, leading to the discontinuation of the project, which contributed to the rarity of this prototype.

Another factor related to hardware is the waning use of cathode ray tube (CRT)-style televisions and monitors in favor of LCD displays. While emulators and hardware devices exist to convert CRT signals to work on LCD, games designed for CRT displays often took advantage of the blurriness of the display that made games appear to look good, whereas in the more defined display of LCD, these artifacts can be jarring and make it difficult to retain the game's original vision.

== Print media preservation ==
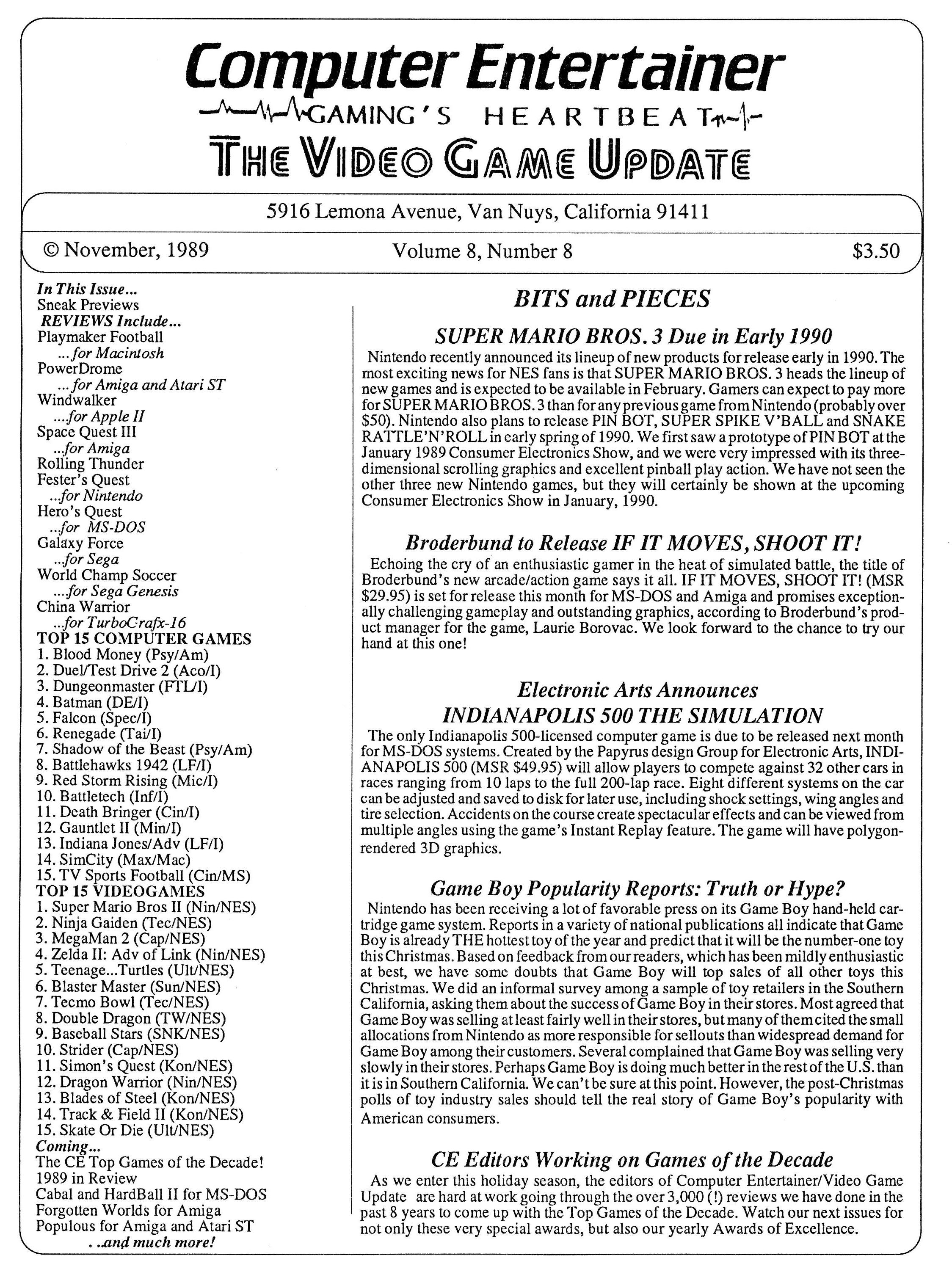
In an act of print media preservation, the Video Game History Foundation digitally archived Computer Entertainer magazine.

Box art and game manuals accompanied most games published before 2000, and there had been an extensive number of magazines published on video games which have since declined. There is a strong interest in the digital preservation of these materials alongside software and hardware as reference material to help document the early history of video games, which did not receive the type of detailed coverage that the field sees as of the 2010s. In most cases, these works are preserved through digital scanning and storage from libraries and user collections. The Video Game History Foundation maintains a physical and digital collection of these magazines in their collection which they opened to public access to its digital collection in January 2025, while RetroMags has similarly worked to provide digital archives of retro gaming magazines under a fair use approach given that most of these magazines and their publishers are now defunct.

== Preservation efforts ==
=== Library of Congress ===
The United States Library of Congress (LoC) launched the National Digital Information Infrastructure and Preservation Program (NDIIPP) in 2000 to preserve non-traditional media. Around 2007, the LoC started reaching out to partners in various industries to help explore how they archive such content. The LoC had funded the University of Illinois at Urbana–Champaign (UIUC) from 2004 to 2010 to develop the ECHO DEPository ("Exploring Collaborations to Harvest Objects in a Digital Environment for Preservation") program.

==== Preserving Virtual Worlds ====
Preserving Virtual Worlds was one project funded by the LoC and conducted by the Rochester Institute of Technology, Stanford University, the University of Maryland, and the University of Illinois at Urbana-Champaign, along with support from Linden Lab, running from 2008 to 2010. The study explored a range of games, from Spacewar! (1962) through Second Life (2003, which was developed by Linden Lab), to determine what methods could be used for preserving these titles. The project concluded that while there are technical solutions for preservation of game software, such as identifying common formats for digital storage and developing database architectures to track ownership, many issues related to preservation remain legal in nature relating to copyright laws.

=== National Film and Sound Archive ===
The National Film and Sound Archive of Australia announced in September 2019 that they will start to create an archive of Australian-developed video games for preservation and exhibition, with games to be added on an annual basis. The preservation effort will include not only the software but art, music, and other creative assets, as well as making considerations for playability in the long-term.

=== Internet Archive ===
The Internet Archive started adding emulation of video games from older systems for play. The Archive developed Emularity, a web-browser based emulator to run a number of out-of-production arcade, console, and computer emulations, and offer numerous titles to be played through the Archive. The project's maintainer, Jason Scott, said that most companies do not take issue with their ROM images being offered in this manner, but did note that Nintendo has put pressure on them to not include any Nintendo consoles within the collection. They also began to archive Adobe Flash animations and games in November 2020, ahead of the December 31, 2020, end-of-life for Adobe Flash, using a new emulator called Ruffle.

=== Video Game History Foundation ===
Frank Cifaldi is one of the leading historians in the video game industry trying to encourage more video game preservation and to help recover games once thought lost. By 2016, he had spent about twenty years trying to encourage preservation as to track video game history, and established the non-profit Video Game History Foundation in 2016. The Foundation not only seeks to preserve games, but box art, manuals, and promotional material from video games, believing that these combined can help future historians understand the culture of games in the past.

=== National Videogame Museum ===
The National Videogame Museum in the United States was born out of archival work performed by John Hardie who had run the Classic Gaming Expo. During this time Hardie had collected a number of video game materials from others and his own efforts. The collection of material collected drew interest from industry events including E3 and the Game Developers Conference, helping to promote the collection. Hardie exhibited the materials through traveling shows, and got interest from Randy Pitchford to establish a permanent home for the collection. The Museum was opened in Frisco, Texas, in 2016. While some companies have donated materials to the Museum, Hardie stated it has been difficult in convincing other developers and publishers to contribute to the preservation efforts.

=== The Centre for Computing History ===
The Centre for Computing History's ongoing efforts have resulted in the physical preservation of over 13,000 video games since 2008. Information for every item in the collection is accessible via their online catalogue. The centre also digitally archives source code for games such as the Magic Knight series by David Jones, and preserves and hosts scans of original sketches and other development materials from game companies such as Guerrilla Games. Their work emphasises the importance of preserving all aspects of the experience of a game, from marketing materials to the copy protection experience, packaging, and hardware. The centre's collection also hosts uncommon hardware and operating systems with this in mind. The centre is also working with current video game developers and publishers, acting as a repository for their ongoing work so that it is actively preserved.

=== The Strong Institute ===
Among other educational aspects The Strong institute in Rochester, New York, operates the International Center for the History of Electronic Games.

=== Videogame Heritage Society ===
The Videogame Heritage Society is an effort started by the United Kingdom's National Videogame Museum along with the British Library, the Museum of London, the Centre for Computing History, the National Science and Media Museum in Bradford, Bath Spa University, and several independent collectors in 2020 to preserve video games developed in the United Kingdom.

=== Game Preservation Society ===
Founded in 2011 in Tokyo, the Game Preservation Society preserves the history of Japanese video games. The organization's focus is the preservation of 1980s Japanese computer games for platforms like the PC-88 and Sharp X1. The society's president, French national Joseph Redon, estimates that they will only be able to preserve about 80% of Japanese computer games.

=== National Software Reference Library ===
While strictly not set up for preservation, the National Software Reference Library, created and maintained by the National Institute of Standards and Technology (NIST) has included a number of popular game software among other software principally used for help in digital forensics, storing electronic copies of these games and other programs. The initial games collection was added in 2016 with numerous titles collected by Stephen Cabrinety, who had died in 1995; in 2018, Valve, Activision-Blizzard, and Electronic Arts all donated additional titles to be added to the collection, while NIST itself purchased other popular titles to include.

=== Hong Kong Game Association (RETRO.HK) ===
Founded in 2015 in Hong Kong by Dixon Wu and other volunteers with decades of video game knowledge, the Hong Kong Game Association is a non-profit society dedicated to preserve, curate, and showcase video game history, especially focusing on locally developed PC & console games, and traditional Chinese video game literature. The Association organizes the annual RETRO.HK Gaming Expo and RetroCup – free annual retro game events that are dedicated to promoting video game and competitive gaming as a culture and art form to the public. The association has worked with multiple local universities or colleges to promote the cause, such as The Hong Kong Polytechnic University, The City University of Hong Kong, The Open University of Hong Kong, and the Hong Kong Institute of Vocational Education (IVE) group.

=== The Museum of Art and Digital Entertainment ===
Founded in 2011 in Oakland, California, the Museum of Art and Digital Entertainment, the MADE performed the first institutional preservation of an online game when it worked with F. Randall Farmer, Chip Morningstar, Fujitsu, and a group of volunteers to relaunch LucasFilm Games' Habitat. This work lead to collaboration with UC Berkeley to petition for a 1201 DMCA exemption for the preservation of MMO games. The source code to Habitat has since been release as open source software under the MIT license. The MADE continues to work on further digital preservation, focusing on source code and online games.

=== Embracer Group Archive ===
The Embracer Group had acquired a large number of video game developers and publishers over the years, and announced in May 2022 the Embracer Group Archive to help preserve games from these groups as well as other parties. While maintained as a physical collection with over 50,000 as of May 2022, the Archive plans to expand to allow online access to portions of its collection for research purposes.

=== The Syd Bolton Collection ===
Formally known as the Personal Computer Museum, the collection of over 14,000 computer and console games and 5,000 game magazines was started by programmer Syd Bolton in 2005 and maintained by a staff of volunteers. Following Bolton's death in 2018, the collection was transferred to the University of Toronto Mississauga Library and kept available to the public via the Syd Bolton Collection.

=== Flashpoint ===
The Adobe Flash standard, heavily used in browser-based video games in the 2000s, was fully removed from most web browsers at the end of 2020 due to long-running security issues with the Flash format, and made these games unplayable. An effort called BlueMaxima's Flashpoint was established in 2018 to collect as many of the freely available Flash games as possible for archival purposes, excluding those games that were offered commercially or that require a server to play, and allowing authors to request removal. As of January 2020, the Flashpoint project had more than 38,000 Flash games in its archive.

=== Project Deluge ===
Project Deluge, run by a group of video game fans called Hidden Palace, is a collection of various video game prototypes from the PlayStation, PlayStation 2, Sega Saturn, Sega Dreamcast, CD-i, and original Xbox console games available in various forms for users to view or play, typically through use of an emulator. These prototypes reportedly are based on a collection of such games maintained by one user who had worked to assure all the prototypes they collected from developers and publishers were digitally preserved so that Hidden Palace was then able to share them with the larger community. Such prototypes can help video game historians track how games had changed over their development period, as well as prototypes of cancelled games. Hidden Palace is also responsible for unearthing many prototypes from the Sonic the Hedgehog games, including finding prototypes of Sonic the Hedgehog and Sonic the Hedgehog 3, previously thought to be lost.

=== GOG Preservation Program ===
GOG.com launched its own preservation program in November 2024 to assure select titles will always remain playable on modern computing hardware. The company will have internal developers work with these titles to assure compatibility against newer hardware and software technologies.

=== Rereleases ===
Companies like GOG.com and Night Dive Studios are recognized for helping to migrate older games to modern systems. Among their efforts include doing the research to track down all legal rights that are associated with a game, including those that have changed hands several times, as to get clearance or rights to republish the title, locate as much of the game's original source code and adapt that to work on modern systems, or when source code is not available, reverse engineer the game to either work natively or through emulation (like DOSBox) with modern hardware. GOG.com and Night Dive have successfully freed some games from IP limbo, such as System Shock 2, while identifying titles that remain difficult to republish and preserve legally due to conflicts on IP rights holders, such as No One Lives Forever. Digital Eclipse has developed its own Eclipse Engine; older games, with publisher approval, are decompiled into core instructions that can be interpreted by the Eclipse Engine, which has been written for modern computer and console support and allow the older game to carry forward.

=== Game-specific archival projects ===
As some games receive continuous updates rather than only having a single definitive stable release, it is possible for older versions of a specific game to become lost. Communities exist which focus on preserving certain such games, such as Omniarchive, a team focusing specifically on archiving Minecraft.

== See also ==
- Video game collecting
