= Harpy (disambiguation) =

A harpy is a female monster in Greek mythology.

Harpy or harpies may also refer to:

== Arts, entertainment, and media ==
- Harpy (DC Comics mythical), a character in DC Comics introduced in Green Lantern
- Harpy (Denise de Sevigne), a character in DC Comics introduced in Star-Spangled War Stories
- Harpy (Iris Phelios), a character in DC Comics introduced in Batman
- Harpy (Xishuangbanna Theme Park), a steel roller coaster in China
- Harpy, a character in Puyo Puyo
- Marlo Chandler or the Harpy, a character in Marvel Comics
- Betty Ross or the Harpy, a character in Marvel Comics
- Harpy Valentine, a minor character from Saint Seiya
- Harpies (film), a 2007 American television film

== Other uses ==
- Fountain of the Harpies, Madrid, a destroyed landmark in Spain
- Harpy eagle, a species of eagle
- IAI Harpy, an unmanned aerial vehicle

== See also ==
- Happy (disambiguation)
- Harp (disambiguation)
- Sharpie (disambiguation)
