= Finders Keepers (1985 video game) =

- Developer: David Jones
- Publisher: Mastertronic
- Platforms: MSX, ZX Spectrum, Commodore 64 / 16, Amstrad CPC
- Release: 1985
- Genre: Platform
- Mode: Single-player

Finders Keepers is a video game written by David Jones and the first game in the Magic Knight series. It was published on the Mastertronic label for the ZX Spectrum, Amstrad CPC, MSX, Commodore 64, and Commodore 16 in 1985. Published in the United Kingdom at the budget price of £1.99. Finders Keepers is a platform game with some maze sections.

On the ZX Spectrum it sold more than 117,000 copies and across all 8-bit formats more than 330,000 copies, making it Mastertronic's second best-selling original game after BMX Racers.

== Plot ==
Magic Knight has been sent to the Castle of Spriteland by the King of Ibsisima in order to find a special present for Princess Germintrude. If Magic Knight is successful in his quest, he may have proved himself worthy of joining the famous "Polygon Table", a reference to the mythical Round Table from the legends of King Arthur.

== Gameplay ==
The hero starts in the King's throne room and is transported, via a teleporter, to the castle. The castle is made up of two types of playing area: flick-screen rooms in the manner of a platform game and two large scrolling mazes. On the ZX Spectrum, Amstrad CPC, and MSX these are "Cold Upper Maze" and the "Slimey Lower Maze"; on the Commodore 64 they consist of "The Castle Gardens" and "The Castle Dungeons".

An additional aspect of the gameplay is the ability to collect objects (found in both the rooms and the mazes) scattered around the castle and sell them for money. Some of these objects can combine or react to create an object of higher value (for example, the bar of lead and the philosopher's stone react to create a bar of gold). Both the amount of money Magic Knight is carrying and the market value of his inventory are displayed on-screen. The buying and selling of objects is done with the various traders who live in the castle.

The Castle of Spriteland is full of dangerous creatures who inhabit its many rooms as well as both of its mazes, and collision with these saps Magic Knight's strength. If he loses all his strength, then he loses one of his four lives.

== Reception ==
Zzap!64 were impressed by the game which was described as a "little masterpiece" and "another quality product" from Mastertronic. It was given a 90% overall rating.

== Legacy ==
Finders Keepers was followed-up by three more Magic Knight games: Spellbound (1985), Knight Tyme (1986), and Stormbringer (1987). They are primarily graphic adventures with a few platform elements.
