= Vanden Winter ende vanden Somer =

Vanden Winter ende vanden Somer is a Middle Dutch drama. It is the shortest of the four abele spelen ("able plays") contained in the Van Hulthem Manuscript, comprising 625 lines in rhyme.

The other abele spelen are: Esmoreit, Gloriant and Lanseloet van Denemerken.

The play deals with the battle between Winter and Summer and their role in arousing erotic love. The play is followed by the sotternie (farce) Rubben.

== Roles ==
- Venus (goddess of love)
- Die Winter
- Die Somer
- Loiaert (on Winter's side, lazy man)
- Moyaert (on Somer's side, dandy)
- Clappaert (on Winter's side, talks a mile a minute)
- Bollaert (on Somer's side, boaster)
- Die Cockien (tramp)

== Plot ==
The main figures Winter and Somer and their companions have a fierce debate about which of the two is the most important season of the year for making love. Both are convinced they are: Winter because of the long nights indoors; Somer because of the "happy season for happy hearts".

With tempers running high, they decide to have a duel to see who is right; they both expect to win to get rid of the other for all time. While both are preparing to fight, Moyaert runs to seek the intervention of the goddess Venus as the arbiter of questions of love.

Venus separates the two, who after some reluctance yield out of respect for her. Venus points out the importance and equality of the two seasons and the fact that the one cannot be without the other. There is only one loser and the end of the play: Cockien had wanted Somer to win.
