= Lippijn =

Lippijn is a Middle Dutch sotternie or farce. It is known from the Van Hulthem Manuscript, in which it follows the "able play" Esmoreit. It consists of 199 lines in rhyme.

The farce describes the older man Lippijn who spots his wife having an adulterous affair. His wife's best lady friend convinces him he must be wrong. His wife hearing about this makes things worse for him by blaming him that he wrongfully accused her.

The name Lippijn refers to the old Middle Dutch word for "looking", thereby connecting with the subject of the play.

== Roles ==
- Lippijn
- Sijn wijf (his wife)
- Haer lief (her lover)
- De comere (Trise or Trees) (the wife's friend)

== Plot ==
Lippijn is sent by his wife to get some wood and water while she buys food. He mutters and complains about her wasting time out of the house; she defends herself by pointing out that the butcher's is always crowded after her morning prayer. They both leave the house, but the wife meets with her longing, passionate lover.

Lippijn watches them in fury and plans to confront his wife with this when he comes home. On his way there he meets Trise, the long-time lady friend of his wife. He tells her what he has seen.

Trise convinces Lippijn that he must be wrong and should not accuse his wife of these things. When Lippijn persists she tells him he must have been possessed by a wood nymph or a goblin.

Trise tells an unconvinced Lippijn that he should not worry because his wife is at the house. Coming home, Lippijn finds out he's been fooled. His wife hearing about his mistrust blames him for it. She is unforgiving about his so-called mistake and the play ends in a quarrel.
