= Lanseloet van Denemerken =

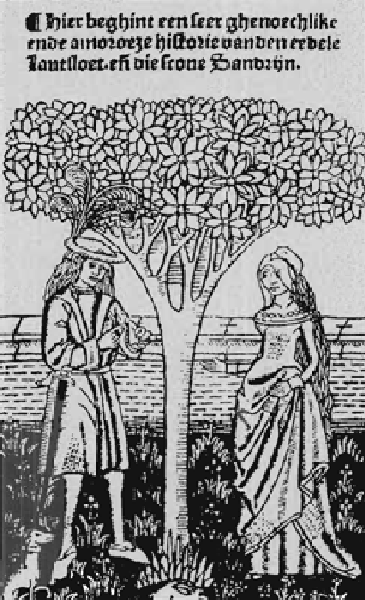
Lanseloet and Sanderijn ("Here begins a very pleasant and amorous history of the noble Lanseloet and the beautiful Sanderijn.")

Lanseloet van Denemerken (Lancelot of Denmark) is a Middle Dutch drama. It is one of the four abele spelen ("able plays") contained in the Van Hulthem Manuscript and consists of 925 lines in rhyme.

The other abele spelen are: Esmoreit, Gloriant, and Vanden Winter ende vanden Somer.

The play Lanseloet van Denemerken deals with the (impossible) love between people of a different social class. It is followed by the sotternie (farce) Die Hexe.

== Roles ==
- Lanseloet
- Sanderijn
- Sine moeder (Lanseloet's mother)
- Een ridder (a knight, husband of Sanderijn)
- Reinout (manservant of Lanseloet)
- Des ridders warande huedere (the knight's gardener)

== Plot ==
The nobleman Lanseloet is in love with the young maiden Sanderijn. He tries to seduce her, but she does not want to get involved because of her own low standing fearing she would not come to marry Lanseloet.

Lanseloet's mother wants to end this affaire and imagines that Lanseloet's love would soon disappear once he has possessed Sanderijn. She thinks of a plan to make Lanseloet promise her he will let Sanderijn go forever after one night with her. Lanseloet agrees. Sanderijn feels humiliated and betrayed and leaves the court. After many journeys she meets a noble knight who marries her even though she has been dishonoured.

Lanseloet now understands how shamefully he has treated Sanderijn. He is still in love with her and sends his manservant Reinout to find her. When he does, she tells Reinout she would never leave her husband for Lanseloet.

Trying to spare his master from suffering he tells him Sanderijn has died. At first Lanseloet distrusts this message, but after seeing evidence of their meeting he knows Sanderijn will be lost to him forever. Lanseloet dies of grief and unreciprocated love.
