= Myrient =

Video game preservation website

- Available in: English
- Founded: 14 October 2022
- Dissolved: 31 March 2026
- Successor: Minerva Archive
- Owner: Alexey
- Website: https://myrient.erista.me/

Myrient was a video game preservation website that provided collections of legacy games for direct download without sign-up or paywalls (such as downloading collections of SNES and Sega Genesis games). The service promoted fast, unrestricted access to archived content and accepted community uploads to build its collections. Its official pages described the project as a preservation-focused archive available to users worldwide. Myrient was part of Erista services alongside hShop, a website dedicated to Nintendo 3DS games.

== History ==
Myrient was founded in October 14, 2022 and was operated by a single administrator known publicly as Alexey. It grew into one of the largest freely accessible retro-game archives, hosting an estimated 390 terabytes of organized data information.

On February 27, 2026, the owner announced that the site would shut down on 31 March 2026, citing unsustainable operating costs, including sharply higher hosting and hardware expenses driven in part by rising RAM, SSD and HDD prices over "$6,000 out of pocket every month", involving decline of donation support and repeated abuse of download protections by third parties. The closure was covered by multiple technology news outlets and triggered community efforts to preserve and download content before the announced shutdown. However, a redditor going by the username of u/III-Economist-5285 announced on March 12 that the Minerva Archive, a group that aimed to backup and redistribute Myrient through torrents, had fully backed up Myrient's contents, preserving its total 385 terabytes of data via torrent file generating.
