= Esmoreit =

Esmoreit is a Middle Dutch drama. It is one of the four abele spelen ("able plays") contained in the Van Hulthem Manuscript and consists of 1,018 lines in rhyme. The other abele spelen are: Gloriant, Lanseloet van Denemerken and Vanden Winter ende vanden Somer.

The play is named after the male protagonist Esmoreit, crown prince of the Kingdom of Sicily. It deals with the love between two people of different social classes and is followed by the sotternie (farce) Lippijn.

One of its sources is the 14th-century chanson de geste Baudouin de Sebourc.

== Roles ==
- Robbrecht (nephew of the king of Sicily)
- Meester (Master Platus, chamberlain to the king of Damascus)
- de coninc (de king of Damascus)
- de jonge (jonc)vrouwe Damiët (daughter of the king of Damascus)
- de kersten coninc/sijn vader (the (Christian) king of Sicily)
- de vrouwe/sine moeder (queen of Sicily and mother of Esmoreit)
- de jonghelinc (Esmoreit, crown-prince of Sicily, raised at the court of Damascus)

== Plot ==
Esmoreit is the crown prince of Sicily. His birth is a concern for his cousin Robbrecht, until then the successor to the throne. He decides to kill Esmoreit.

At the court of Damascus a prophecy foretells that a foreign prince will kill the king of Damascus and marry his daughter Damiët. The king then decides to look for this prince to take him to his court and raise him as his son to avoid the murder. He sends out Platus to look for the prince.

In Sicily, Platus meets Robbrecht, who is trying to kill Esmoreit by drowning him in a well. Platus buys the child for one thousand pounds in gold ("om dusent pont van goude ghetelt") and brings him to Damascus. Robbrecht accuses the queen of the murder on her son and she is imprisoned by the king, who is enraged with grief.

The king of Damascus leaves Esmoreit in the care of Damiët, telling her he is an abandoned child.

Many years later, Esmoreit discovers Damiët is not his sister and that she has fallen in love with him. Esmoreit has fallen in love with Damiët but she cannot reciprocate his love because she considers him of lower class.

He also finds out that he is not abandoned and goes to look for his parents. When Esmoreit comes to Sicily he discovers his true identity: the cloth he was found in is recognized by the queen, who is still locked up. While the king and queen are united, Robbrecht is still not punished.

In the meantime, Damiët cannot stand being without Esmoreit and she decides to go after him. She leaves with Platus, dressed as a pilgrim. Meeting him in Sicily gives great joy: Esmoreit introduces Damiët to his father who resigns his throne in behalf of Esmoreit. Platus recognizes Robbrecht as the man from whom he bought Esmoreit. Robbrecht is hanged. Esmoreit and Damiët marry.
