= Baudouin de Sebourc =

Medieval French epic poem

Baudouin de Sebourc is a fourteenth-century French chanson de geste which probably formed part of a cycle related to the Crusades, and may well be related to Bâtard de Bouillon. The poem was likely composed c. 1350 in Hainaut.

The poem consists of 25,750 lines and is retained in two manuscript copies and was printed in 1841; a critical edition wasn't published until 1940. This edition, by Edmond-René Labande, advanced two ideas about the poem. The first was that it should be dated to the middle of the fourteenth century rather than earlier in that century, and the second that it was written by two poets—the first a very capable writer with a fine sense of humor, the second a much less original one.

== Plot ==
According to Claassens, the plot "is impossible to summarize ... briefly". The main character's father, King Ernoul of Nijmegen, travels to the Orient to deliver his brother from Saracen captivity. In the meantime his seneschal, Gaufroi of Friesland, takes Ernoul's place in his bed and on his throne, having betrayed his king to Sultan Rouge-Lion. Ernoul has four sons, all of whom go their various ways to escape the threat of death at the hands of Gaufroi; Baudouin is the youngest of them. At age two he is taken in at the court of the Lord of Sebourc.

Baudouin sires 31 (bastard) children, one of them with his patron's daughter. He falls in love with the sister of the Count of Flanders, Blanche, and runs off with her. They intend to travel to the Orient, and this sets off a series of extraordinary adventures. They get married, but by hook and crook Gaufroi manages to capture Blanche, forcing Baudoin to travel alone, having adventures in places like Baghdad and Jerusalem. He is reunited with his family; together they return and are able to defeat Gaufroi. After a winter in Nijmegen Baudouin returns to help the King of Jerusalem fight off the Saracens, and he leaves, this time with his 31 children.

== Background ==
The poem is closely related to other poems from the Crusade cycle including Les Chétifs and continuations of the 13th-century La conquête de Jérusalem. The poem has historical connections; Baudoin seems to be based on Baldwin II of Jerusalem (d. 1131) and Guy of Lusignan (1150-1194), but his name, "de Sebourc", derives from a town near Valenciennes.

A central tension in the narrative is between Holland and Friesland, a tension unique to Old French poetry but well known from the literature of the Low Countries. Gaufroi is Frisian, and the Frisian town of Leeuwarden falls to him by treachery. The poem comes from Hainault, and since the Counts of Hainault had become the Counts of Holland by 1299 (after the death of John I, Count of Holland), it appears that Hainault had adopted the animosity that existed between Holland and Friesland.

== Legacy ==
The poem has left no trace in the visual arts, and there are only a few surviving copies. While it exerted little influence on other works, it did, after translation into Middle Dutch, provide a source for names and motifs for the two plays Esmoreit and Gloriant.
