= David Jones (programmer) =

Computer game programmer

David Jones is a former freelance computer game programmer, who was prolific in the mid-to-late 1980s. He is best known for the creation of the computer game character Magic Knight in his 1985 game Finders Keepers for the Mastertronic budget label and released on the ZX Spectrum, Amstrad CPC, MSX and Commodore 64. He later went on to work for Psygnosis and Acclaim.

Finders Keepers spawned three sequels: Spellbound (1985), Knight Tyme (1986) and Stormbringer (1987).

In 2019, Jones donated the Tandy TRS-80 Model III computer that he used to create the Magic Knight series of games to The Centre for Computing History. Also donated were many floppy disks, and a hard disk that containing source code and assets for many of his games. The data will be preserved as part of the Centre's ongoing video game preservation work.

As of 2019, Jones is a Games Lecturer at Breda University of Applied Sciences in the Netherlands.
