= Patricia Finney =

English author and journalist

Patricia Finney (born 1958) is an English author and journalist with Hungarian forebears. She is a graduate of Oxford University (Wadham, 1977–80) with a degree in History. She has written under the pen names P. F. Chisholm and Grace Cavendish.

Her first novel A Shadow of Gulls, published when she was 18, won the 1977 David Higham Award for Best First Novel of the year. In the same year BBC Radio 3 presented her play, The Flood.

As well as writing radio plays, such as A Room Full of Mirrors, Finney has published twenty-one novels, many of which are set in Elizabethan times. They include spy thrillers, crime novels and children's books. Finney has also published three books (the Jack series) written in "Doglish", the language of dogs.

== Published works ==
Lugh Mac Romain Series

1. A Shadow of Gulls (1977)
2. The Crow Goddess (1978)

David Becket and Simon Ames Series

1. Firedrake's Eye (1992)
2. Unicorn's Blood (1998)
3. Gloriana's Torch (2003)

Robert Carey Series (writing as P. F. Chisholm)

1. A Famine of Horses (1994)
2. A Season of Knives (1995)
3. A Surfeit of Guns (1996)
4. A Plague of Angels (1998)
5. A Murder of Crows (2010)
6. An Air of Treason (2014)
7. A Chorus of Innocents (2015)
8. A Clash of Spheres (2017)
9. A Suspicion of Silver (2018)

Lady Grace Cavendish Series (writing as Grace Cavendish)

1. Assassin (2004)
2. Betrayal (2004)
3. Conspiracy (2004)
6. Feud (2006)

Jack Series
1. I, Jack (2000)
2. Jack and Police Dog Rebel (2002)
3. Jack and the Ghosts (2013)
