= Abele spelen =

The abele spelen (Dutch pronunciation: [ˈaːbələ ˈspeːlə(n)]) are a collection of four plays contained in the Van Hulthem Manuscript, which dates from 1410 and is in the collection of the Royal Library of Belgium in Brussels (shelfmark hs. 15.589-623).

The word abele means ‘noble’, and spelen means ‘plays’. In this instance the word ‘noble’ is used as the opposite of ‘religious’, i.e. 'profane'. The "noble plays" date from around 1350. They are the oldest plays of a worldly, non-religious nature known in the Dutch language, and among the oldest known in West-European theatre.

All four plays concern love, and are written in the style of stories of hoofse liefde or courtly love (note that the word ‘hof’ means ‘court’). Respectively, the amorous pairs in the plays are Esmoreit and Damiët, Gloriant and Florentijn, Lanseloet and Sanderijn, Winter and Somer, the latter being an allegory.

The four abele spelen are:

- Esmoreit (1018 lines)
- Gloriant (1142 lines)
- Lanseloet van Denemerken (925 lines)
- Vanden Winter ende vanden Somer (625 lines)

Usually the performance of every ‘abel spel’ was followed by a sotternie, a farce. Because of the noble nature of the play, the same theme was played out in a more populistic and explicit form. The farces belong to the different abele spelen as follows:

- Lippijn (199 lines) -– Esmoreit
- Buskenblazer (208 lines) – Gloriant
- Die Hexe (112 lines) – Lanseloet van Denemerken
- Rubben (245 lines) – Vanden Winter ende vanden Somer
- Truwanten (incomplete)
- Drie daghe here (incomplete)

It has been suggested that there used to be six abele spelen because of the number of sotternieën belonging to them.
