= Gloriant =

Middle Dutch drama

Gloriant is a Middle Dutch drama. It is one of the four abele spelen ("able plays") contained in the Van Hulthem Manuscript, and consists of 1,142 lines in rhyme. The other abele spelen are Esmoreit, Lanseloet van Denemerken and Vanden Winter ende vanden Somer.

The play is named after its male protagonist Gloriant, duke of Bruuyswijc. It explores the love between two people of different religion and is followed by the sotternie (farce) Buskenblaser.

One of its sources is the 14th-century chanson de geste Baudouin de Sebourc.

== Roles ==
- Gheraert (uncle of duke Gloriant)
- Godevaert (friend of duke Gloriant)
- Gloriant (Duke of Bruuyswijc)
- Florentijn die maghet (daughter of Rodelioen)
- Rogier (servant of Florentijn)
- Rode Lioen (Rodelioen, Lord of Abelant)
- Floerant (cousin of Rodelioen)
- De Hangdief (the executioner)

== Plot ==
Gloriant is the duke of Bruuyswijc and a bachelor by heart. His relatives Gheraert and Godevaert urge him to marry to make sure there is a successor. Gloriant does not make haste.

Florentijn, daughter of Rodelioen from Abelant, hears of him and sees much of herself in Gloriant's way of doing. She sends her help Rogier to Gloriant with a portrait of hers.

When Gloriant sees it, he immediately falls in love with her, but then the trouble starts: his relatives now are less keen on him marrying Florentijn because Gloraint’s father had killed several relatives of Rodelieon during a crusade. This will not help in getting Gloriant a good reception.

Despite this Gloriant goes to Abelant to get Florentijn. They meet in an orchard near the palace and confess their love for each other. They decide to leave the very night. Overcome by fatigue Gloriant falls asleep in Florentijn's lap. Floerant, Rodelioen's cousin, finds them there; he takes Gloriant's sword (Brant) and betrays them.

Rodelioen is outraged and imprisons Gloriant and Florentijn in order to kill them. Faithful Rogier manages to free Gloriant and hides him in the forest. He plays a risky double play and goes to Rodelioen to advise him to have Florentijn beheaded right away. Because of her betrayal of her own religion for Christianity he agrees. Just before her death Gloriant leaps forward, kills Rodelioen and takes Florentijn to Bruuyswijc to marry her.
