= Centre for Computing History =

Museum in Cambridge, England

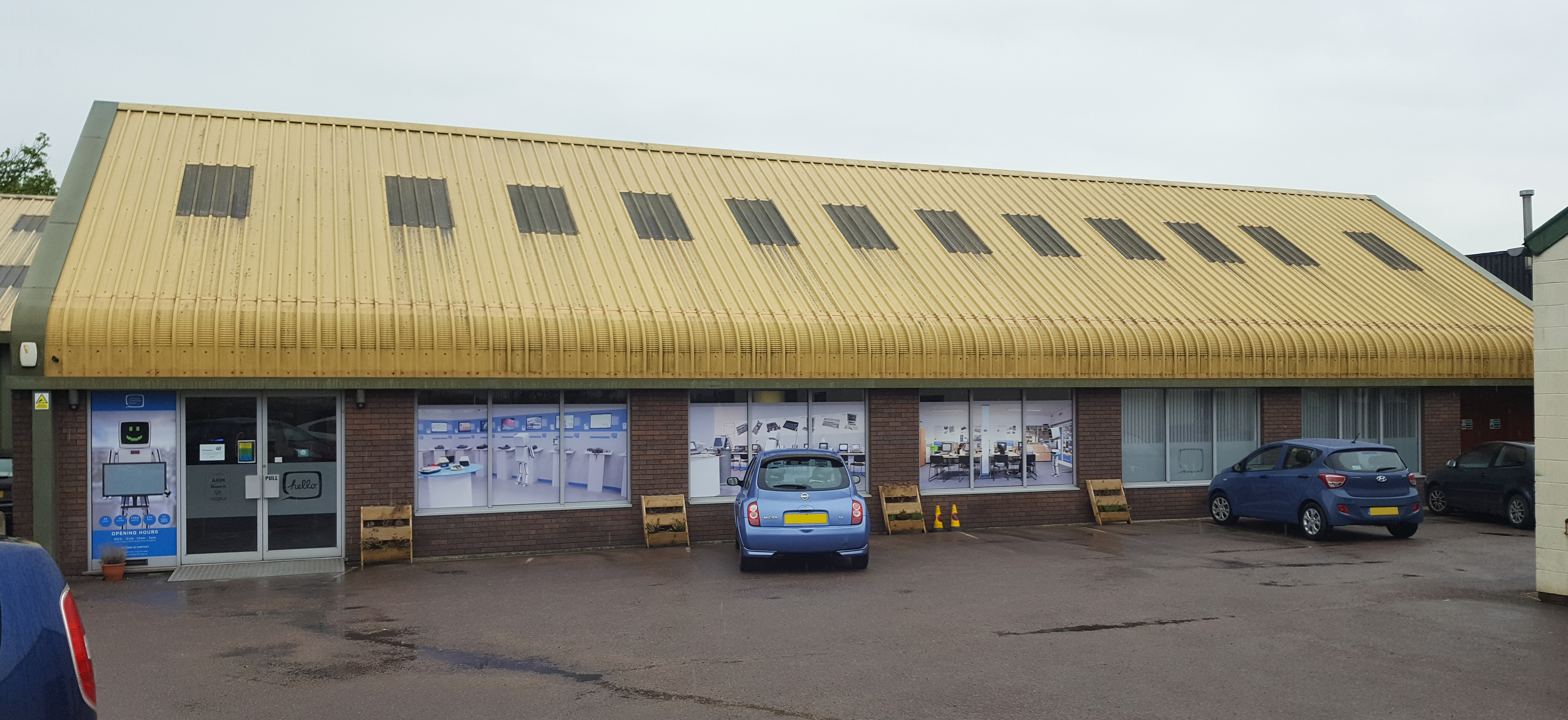
- Established: 2007
- Location: Cambridge, Cambridgeshire
- Type: Computers
- Director: Lizzie Salter
- Public transit access: Newmarket Road
- Parking: On site
- Website: computinghistory.org.uk

The Centre for Computing History is a computer museum in Cambridge, England, established to create a permanent public exhibition telling the story of the Information Age.

== Overview ==
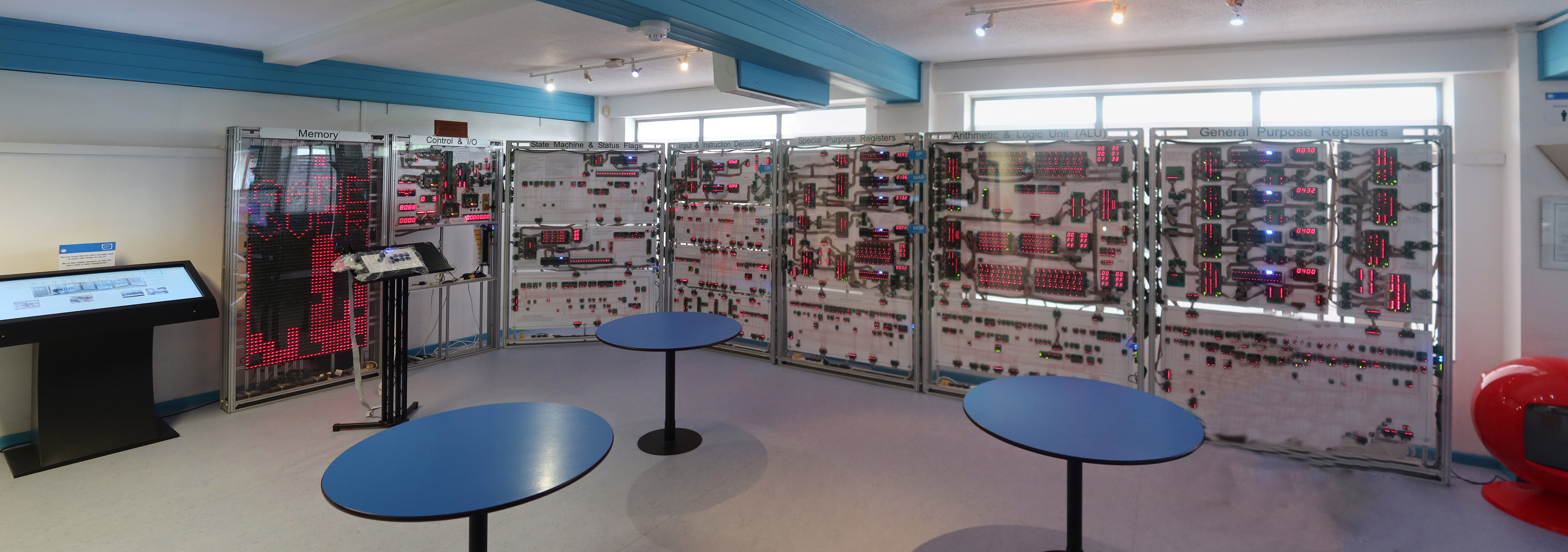
The Megaprocessor

The museum acts as a repository for vintage computers and related artefacts. The museum is open Wednesdays through to Sundays from 10am to 5pm in term time and 7 days a week during school holidays. On display are key items from the early era of computers (and even before) from ageing comptometers through the Altair 8800 to the ZX Spectrum and Apple II. The museum also holds vintage games consoles, peripherals, software and an extensive collection of computer manuals, magazines and other literature. It is home to the world's largest microprocessor, known as the Megaprocessor, a Guinness World Record-breaking version of a computer chip, designed by James Newman.

== History and status ==
The Centre for Computing History (CCH) began in 2006, when a new ‘hands-on’ museum of personal computing was an idea in the collective mind of three friends, one of whom, Jason Fitzpatrick, owned an extensive collection of computing-related artefacts. The other two founders were Elaine Symonds and Dr Lisa McGerty. The centre is a registered educational charity. It is funded by a combination of sponsors from local businesses and private individuals. Venture capitalist and entrepreneur Hermann Hauser was involved with funding discussions. He became patron of the museum in December 2011, 30 years after the launch of the BBC Micro. The museum is run by a board of trustees chaired by Gareth Marlow.

The Centre moved to a 10,500 sq ft (980 m^{2}) site in Rene Court, off Coldham's Lane in the east side of Cambridge in summer 2013. The museum was originally located in Haverhill, Suffolk. Plans to relocate the museum to Cambridge, led to a report in October 2011 that negotiations were underway for a site. The museum was informed in June 2012 that planning permission for the new Cambridge site had been granted, subject to complying with current building regulations.

In March 2019, the museum was granted Accredited Museum status by Arts Council England (ACE). The Accreditation Scheme sets out nationally agreed standards, which inspire the confidence of the public and funding and governing bodies. It enables museums to assess their current performance, as well as supporting them to plan and develop their services.

== Activities ==
Tour at the museum in 2016

The Centre for Computing History runs regular educational activities for schools and the general public. These range from programming workshops using 1980s BBC Micros to gaming tours to coding using software like Scratch for the Raspberry Pi.

The centre collects and preserves historical computing related artefacts and has undertaken a project to preserve the data from the BBC Domesday Project and make it available online. They already have data from both the National Disk and Community Disk online and are currently investigating copyright issues before releasing the URL to the general public. The centre's oldest working machine is their Elliott 903, which is regularly demonstrated; other important artefacts in the centre's collection include a prototype ZX Spectrum, Professor Steve Furber's Computer Group prototype and a NeXT computer signed by Sir Tim Berners-Lee.

In June 2017, some of the centre's volunteers received recognition for their contributions to the museum at the annual SHARE Museums East Volunteer Awards.

In 2017 and 2018, the museum was heavily involved in the Butlin's Astonishing Science weekends, taking a time line of computers and consoles, to show the advancement of technology through the years. Also having 8 BBC Micros and Raspberry Pis alongside them for completion of various programming tasks, including Robots, disco lights, and creating pixel characters.

In October 2018, the centre received lottery funding for a project on LEO computers, in partnership with the LEO Computers Society. The project, Swiss Rolls, Tea and the Electronic Office: A History of LEO, the First Business Computer, aims to bring together, preserve, archive and digitise a range of LEO Computers artefacts, documents and personal memories to share the largely unknown story of LEO with a new audience. The project includes plans to develop a virtual reality replica of the LEO I.

The centre was awarded an Object of The Year award from 'Museums in Cambridgeshire' in November 2019 for their Sinclair ZX Spectrum prototype, donated earlier that year from a company that had worked on it during its development.

The centre is regularly recognised as a top attraction, with a 2024 and 2025 Tripadvisor Traveller’s Choice awards, placing it in the top 10% of attractions worldwide.

In September 2024 the centre collaborated with Orca Scan and Datalogic to launch a temporary exhibition to mark the 50th anniversary of the first retail barcode being scanned. The History of Barcodes exhibition highlighted the significant role that barcodes have played in computing history by linking a physical product to its digital identity.

The Esmée Fairbairn Collections Fund, run by the Museums Association, awarded the Centre for Computing History a £93,200 grant for a two year project, 'Broken Tech: Broken Earth', which began in November 2024. This initiative aims to engage the local community in exploring the environmental and social impacts of the tech boom.

With their collection of over 13,000 video games, the centre also has a video game preservation initiative, and information for every object in the museum collection is accessible via the online catalogue. As part of preservation, they digitally archive source code for games such as the Magic Knight series by David Jones, and preserve and host scans of original sketches and other development materials from game companies such as Guerrilla Games. Their work emphasises the importance of preserving all aspects of the experience of a game, from marketing materials to the copy protection experience, packaging, and hardware. The centre's collection also hosts uncommon hardware and operating systems. They are also working with current video game developers and publishers, acting as a repository for their ongoing work so that it is actively preserved.

Prior to receiving accredited museum status, the centre loaned artefacts for film and TV productions, helping with props and sets for The IT Crowd, Brits Who Made the Modern World on Channel Five with Peter Snow. In April 2009 it produced the Gadget Hall of Fame stand at The Gadget Show Live exhibition at the NEC in Birmingham. In December 2018, the centre was involved in a groundbreaking interactive Netflix episode of Black Mirror called Bandersnatch.
