= Lady Grace Mysteries =

Historical detective fiction series

The Lady Grace Mysteries is a series of children's detective fiction novels initially written by English author Patricia Finney, with Sara Volger and Jan Burchett later joining as co-authors.

Written as a diary, the story follows Lady Grace Cavendish, a maid of honour to Queen Elizabeth I, attempting to solve various mysteries within the royal court.

== Series ==
- Assassin by Patricia Finney, Doubleday, 2004, ISBN 978-0-385-60644-8
- Betrayal by Patricia Finney, Doubleday, 2004, ISBN 978-0-385-60645-5
- Conspiracy by Patricia Finney, 2005, ISBN 978-0385731539
- Deception by Sara Volger & Jan Burchett, 2005
- Exile by Sara Vogler & Jan Burchett, 2006
- Feud by Patricia Finney, 2006
- Gold by Sara Vogler & Jan Burchett, 2006
- Haunted by Sara Vogler & Jan Burchett, 2006
- Intrigue by Sara Vogler & Jan Burchett, 2008
- Jinx by Sara Vogler & Jan Burchett, 2008
- Keys by Sara Vogler & Jan Burchett, 2009
- Loot by Sara Vogler & Jan Burchett, 2010

== Adaptation ==
A television adaptation of Patricia Finney's book series entitled The Lady Grace Mysteries was announced in October 2024, when Federation Studios via its French kids & family film/television production subsidiary and Mainz-based German commercial & production/distribution division of German broadcaster ZDF, ZDF Studios, had partnered with British media company behind the novel series, Coolabi Productions, who owns the subsidiary Working Partners, to develop a adaptation based on Patricia Finney's book series with German broadcaster ZDF, British television broadcasting network BBC and French broadcasting company France Televisions had ordered the series while Cottonwood Media's parent Federation Studios via its children's entertainment arm Federation Kids & Family and ZDF's German production/distribution arm ZDF Studios would jointly handle distribution to the series.

On 27 March 2025, BBC Children's & Education had commissioned & orders the 10-episode adaptation of Patricia Finney's book series The Lady Grace Mysteries to air it on BBC's British children's television channel CBBC which it premiered. The 10-episode television series titled The Lady Grace Mysteries premiered a year later on CBBC and BBC iPlayer on 20 April 2026.

The series is adapted for television by Anna McCleery and stars Evie Coles as Lady Grace Cavendish, Twinkle Jaiswal as Lady Sarah, Fintan Buckard as Lord Osborne, Lady Grace's possible love interest, and Rebecca Scott as Queen Elizabeth I. Production took place in Brussels and County Durham, including Brussels Town Hall, Brancepeth Castle and Raby Castle. Costume design was by Alexia Crisp-Jones and music by Jeremy Warmsley.

Sara Baalla of the Liverpool Echo wrote: "The 'vibrant' new drama brings the excitement, humour and intrigue of Queen Elizabeth I's court to life for younger audiences, as well as older fans who grew up with the books."
