= MobyGames =

Video game database

- Logo since March 2014

- Screenshot Frontpage as of April 2012
- Website type: Gaming
- Available in: English
- Owner: Atari SA
- Founders: Jim Leonard; Brian Hirt
- Website: mobygames.com
- Commercial: Yes
- Registration: Optional
- Launched: March 1, 1999; 27 years ago
- Current status: Online

MobyGames is a commercial database website that catalogs information on video games and the people and companies behind them via crowdsourcing. This includes over 300,000 games for hundreds of platforms. Founded in 1999, ownership of the site has changed several times. It has been owned by Atari SA since 2022.

== Features ==
Credits for Bubsy in: Claws Encounters of the Furred Kind on MobyGames.

MobyGames catalogs extensive information including screenshots, box art, developer information, game summaries, and more about all developed video games from the 1970s to the modern day. Edits and submissions to the site go through a verification process of fact-checking by volunteer "approvers". This approval process after submission can range from minutes to days or months. There is a published standard on the site for how to format game information and copy-editing, as well as for defining what type of data is allowed. A ranking system allows users to earn points for contributing accurate information.

The site has been likened to the IMDb equivalent for the video game industry because of Moby's large, centralized collection of game developer credits. This parallel was strengthened when Moby later introduced a paid-access tier of features for game development professionals, including job listings, insights into the career trajectory of connections, and the abiility for developers to upload their own portfolio of work, among other features.

Registered users can rate and review games. Users can create private or public "have" and "want" lists, which can generate a list of games available for trade with other registered users. The site contains an integrated forum. Each listed game can have its own sub-forum.

== History ==
Logo used until March 2014

=== Founding and unpopular purchase ===
MobyGames was founded on March 1, 1999, by Jim Leonard and Brian Hirt, and joined by David Berk 18 months later, the three of which had been friends since high school. Leonard had the idea of sharing information about computer games with a larger audience. The database began with information about games for IBM PC compatibles, relying on the founders' personal collections. Eventually, the site was opened up to allow general users to contribute information. In a 2003 interview, Berk emphasized MobyGames' dedication to taking video games more seriously than broader society and to preserving games for their important cultural influence.

In mid-2010, MobyGames was purchased by GameFly for an undisclosed amount. This was announced to the community post factum, and the site's interface was given an unpopular redesign. A few major contributors left, refusing to do volunteer work for a commercial website as well as protesting the lack of communication with the community and perceived mismanagement by the new owners.

=== Rollback and Atari acquisition ===
On December 18, 2013, MobyGames was acquired by Jeremiah Freyholtz, owner of Blue Flame Labs (a San Francisco-based game and web development company) and VGBoxArt (a site for fan-made video game box art). Blue Flame Labs reverted MobyGames' interface to its pre-overhaul look and feel, and for the next eight years, the site was run by Freyholtz and Independent Games Festival organizer Simon Carless.

On November 24, 2021, Atari SA announced a potential deal with Blue Flame Labs to purchase MobyGames for $1.5 million. The purchase was completed on 8 March 2022, with Freyholtz remaining as general manager. Over the next year, the financial boost given by Atari led to a rework of the site being built from scratch with a new backend codebase, as well as updates improving the mobile and desktop user interface. This was accomplished by investing in full-time development of the site instead of its previously part-time development.

In 2024, MobyGames introduced a paid "Pro" membership option to generate additional revenue. Previously, the site had generated income exclusively through banner ads and (from March 2014 onward) a small number of patrons via the Patreon website. This MobyPro membership was later rebranded to "MobyPlus" and was split into two tiers for hobbyists wishing to gain additional data access.

On February 13, 2025, Freyholtz stepped down as the site lead, leaving operations to Tracy Poff, a veteran coder on the site, and Atari staff.

In 2026, the site rolled out various features focused on game development professionals. Developers with free user accounts were given the ability to "claim" their profiles and, after verification, add additional details to works on their developer pages that they had already been credited with in the database. A third paid tier for user accounts targeting Professionals was also launched, complementing the existing two MobyPlus and Hobbyist tiers. This Professional tier allowed users to, among other things, create a portfolio page to show off their work, view job listings, and see information about their career network connections.

== See also ==
- IGDB – game database used by Twitch for its search and discovery functions
