= Magic Knight =

Video game series

Magic Knight is a computer game franchise created by freelance programmer David Jones originally for the 1985 game Finders Keepers on the Mastertronic budget label. Finders Keepers is a flip-screen platform game released on the ZX Spectrum, Amstrad CPC, MSX and Commodore 64. The game spawned three additional sequels (also starring Magic Knight) on the Mastertronic Added Dimension budget label: Spellbound (1985), Knight Tyme (1986) and Stormbringer (1987). The three sequels are far less action-orientated, being effectively graphic adventure games using a basic menu system ("Windimation") for Magic Knight to interact with characters and items instead of typed commands.

== Plot ==
=== Finders Keepers ===
Magic Knight is ordered by the King to go to Spriteland and bring back a fitting birthday present for the Princess. Magic Knight is transported to the castle in Spriteland and can either amass as much treasure as possible or find a suitable present and return to the King.

=== Spellbound ===
The wizard Gimbal accidentally mixes up a spell, which results in casting himself, Magic Knight and an array of other characters into an unknown castle. Magic Knight must find Gimbal and reverse the spell to return everyone home.

- Crime Busters by IJK Software in 1986 used significant portions of the Spellbound code without permission, and was ultimately removed from sale.

=== Knight Tyme ===
After freeing Gimbal, the spell to send Magic Knight home goes wrong, and instead of being sent back to the Middle Ages, he awakens on the USS Pisces in the 25th century. Magic Knight must then find a way to reach the Tyme Guardians and return home.

=== Stormbringer ===
On returning from the 25th century, Magic Knight finds his local village terrorised by the "Off-White Knight", who has taken residence in the castle. Further investigation shows the Off-White Knight to be the evil side of Magic Knight himself, and the task is to join the two together again.

== Gameplay ==
Descriptions are based on the ZX Spectrum versions, although all versions are broadly the same in gameplay.

=== Finders Keepers ===
The game is a traditional flip-screen platform game, with a small Magic Knight having to negotiate screens filled with numerous monsters, which move in pre-defined paths. There are also two scrolling mazes that Magic Knight must traverse to enter new sections of the map. Variation is added to the gameplay by the addition of objects, which can be picked up and utilised, or traded with the Traders that are scattered throughout various points in the castle (and coincidentally look exactly like Magic Knight). Certain objects, when carried at the same time will react to create new objects. Magic Knight has four lives, each with its own energy bar that is depleted by collisions with monsters, or certain parts of the floor.

=== Spellbound ===
This game marked a significant departure from Finders Keepers. Magic Knight increased in size and the monsters were disposed of. This game also introduced the Windimation system, whereby the player could interact with other objects and characters (pick up/drop/throw/command/cast magic) via a system of menus. Magic Knight (and indeed the other characters in the game) all had RPG-like stats instead of the previous simple energy bar.

=== Knight Tyme ===
This game operates in virtually the same way as Spellbound. It introduced the "advert" item, which appeared to have no purpose, but was essential as it could be stood on, allowing Magic Knight to reach otherwise inaccessible areas. The first mission is to get the crew of the USS Pisces to obey Magic Knight and to repair the ship. Once this is done they gain the ability to travel to anywhere in the galaxy. Magic Knight can beam down to some of these planets and explore on arrival, although he soon finds that not all of them are friendly.

This game was released in 48k and 128k versions, with the latter having many more locations and in-game music.

=== Stormbringer ===
Similar again from a control point of view, but with a larger and more varied map, increased puzzle difficulty and more characters. One of the first missions in the game is to find out what job is currently on at the castle and then finding a disguise to get in. The game was also released in 48k and 128k versions, with the latter featuring more locations and in-game music.

== Legacy ==
In 2019, Jones donated the Tandy TRS-80 Model III computer that he used to create these games to The Centre for Computing History. Many floppy disks were also donated, along with a hard disk which contained source code and assets for many of his games. The data was preserved as part of the centre's ongoing video game preservation work. A game called Crime Busters featuring a detective in a mansion, was released by IJK Software in 1986, and found to use significant portions of the Spellbound code. This game was withdrawn following Mastertronic's demand for a written apology from the Crime Busters author, Harry S. Price, and the threat of legal action after Price refused to apologise.
