= IGDB =

Video game database

Internet Game Database (IGDB)
- Website type: Online database
- Available in: English
- Headquarters: Gothenburg, Sweden
- CEO: Christian Frithiof
- Parent: Amazon
- Website: igdb.com
- Registration: Optional, Free
- Launched: 2014
- Current status: Online
- Written in: Ruby, Kotlin

The Internet Game Database (IGDB) is an online database about video games launched in 2014. It was acquired by Twitch, a subsidiary of Amazon, in 2019, to use for Twitch's search and discoverability features.

== Overview ==
An IGDB page for Weasel Willy.

The IGDB lists details about video games and their companies, crew and cast. Similar to Amazon's Internet Movie Database, IGDB's content is user focused, letting registered users rate, list and review games. Users can also edit and create pages, which are published after being validated by IGDB's employees.

== History ==
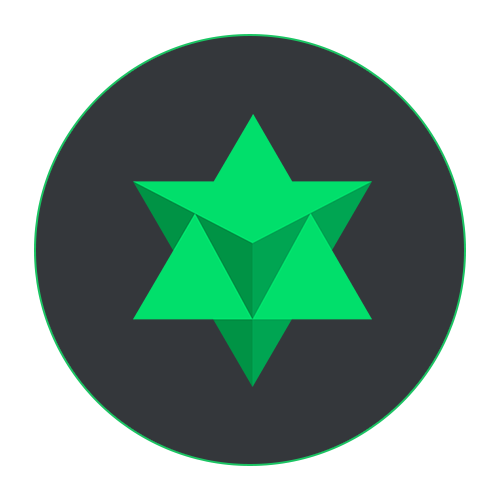
IGDB's old logo

IGDB was founded by Christian Frithiof after he first got the idea in 2010 and was able to gather a team. A beta version containing around 200 games was launched in 2014. In August 2015, IGDB introduced a developer API free for non-commercial and commercial usage.

In 2016, IGDB secured their first investment which allowed its employees to work full time and relocate to Gothenburg, Sweden. As of 2020 IGDB has their own office, with a branch in USA and 11 employees working remote from various countries.

On September 17, 2019, IGDB was acquired by Twitch, a livestreaming video platform owned by Twitch Interactive, a subsidiary of Amazon. Twitch use IGDB's database to feed its search and discovery functions.

As of March 2023, IGDB has 99,000 members and encompasses 428,000 games (of which 196,500 are DLCs and re-releases), 44,300 companies and 217,000 people as well as over 1.1 million reviews, screenshots and videos.

== See also ==
- MobyGames – game database launched in 1999 with extensive credits data.
