= Spellbound (video game) =

1985 video game

- C64 Cover Art
- Publisher: Mastertronic (M.A.D. label)
- Designer: David Jones
- Programmer: David Jones
- Composer: Rob Hubbard
- Platforms: ZX Spectrum, Commodore 64, Amstrad CPC, Atari 8-bit, MSX
- Release: 1985: Amstrad CPC, ZX Spectrum; 1986: Atari 8-bit, C64; 2023: MSX
- Genre: Graphic adventure
- Mode: Single-player

Spellbound is a video game that was designed and programmed by David Jones with music by Rob Hubbard and released in 1985 for the ZX Spectrum and Amstrad CPC (also with Ed Hickman) home computers. Versions for the Commodore 64 (with Richard Darling) and the Atari 8-bit computers (with Adrian Sheppard) and an enhanced 128K Spectrum version with music and additional graphics were all released in 1986. Unlike the other Magic Knight games, Spellbound was never released for the MSX system back in 1985, but an authorized version was finally released by Tracy Lewis in 2023. It is the second game in the Magic Knight series and was published by Mastertronic as part of their Mastertronic Added Dimension label.

== Plot ==
Magic Knight is transported to a castle with a collection of other characters and must rescue his friend Gimbal the wizard. Gimbal has become trapped by a self-inflicted "white-out" spell whilst trying to create a better-tasting rice pudding. Magic Knight must rescue Gimbal from his self-inflicted imprisonment and then ensure both he and the castle's other inhabitants are all returned to their correct time and place.

== Gameplay ==
Gameplay screenshot (Atari 8-bit)

Unlike the previous game in the series, Finders Keepers, the game is less action-oriented and more of a graphic adventure although it still contains some platform game elements.

The player controls Magic Knight as he wanders around the castle. As well as the player character, the cast also contains various other characters who have found themselves trapped. Like Magic Knight, these characters move around (albeit off-screen, they are always static when on-screen) and can fall asleep and grow hungry. Magic Knight needs to look after and "maintain" these other characters (as well as himself) and this adds a further strategic element to gameplay.

Magic Knight interacts with his environment and other characters using a drop-down window system called "Windimation", which is full of commands such as "take object" and "talk to character". Because of this, much of the gameplay is quite similar to later graphic adventures such as The Secret of Monkey Island. Most of the game's puzzles are solved by using objects in the correct place or giving objects to the correct character and then having them assist the player. Another method of solving problems is to use Magic Knight's spellcasting abilities. Most of his spells require him to have collected certain objects first.

The castle itself consists of several floors (including a roof garden and a basement) that can be accessed via a lift. Some of these areas are only fully accessible once some puzzles are solved.

Magic Knight only has a certain amount of energy and if he runs out of this he dies and it is game over. His energy is depleted both by moving between rooms and when dangerous objects such as bouncing balls hit him. Finding a way of topping up Magic Knight's energy is one of the first puzzles the player must solve. There are also a few rooms that cause Magic Knight to die just by entering them. These can be passed by solving puzzles.

The game is also played against a time limit: there are only 48 hours of in-game time until Gimbal is destroyed by his spell and Magic Knight and the other characters are trapped in the castle forever.

== Legacy ==
Reception

Awards
Publication	Award
Crash	Crash Smash
Sinclair User	SU Classic
Your Sinclair	Megagame

Two further Magic Knight games were released: Knight Tyme (1986) and Stormbringer (1987). A game called Crime Busters featuring a detective in a mansion, was released by IJK Software in 1986, and found to use significant portions of the Spellbound code. This game was withdrawn following Mastertronic's demand for a written apology from the Crime Busters author, Harry S. Price, and the threat of legal action after Price refused to apologise.
