= Harpy (Denise de Sevigne) =

DC Comics comic book supervillain

The Harpy
- The first Harpy

Publication information
- Publisher: DC Comics
- First appearance: Star-Spangled War Stories #140 (September 1968)
- Created by: Robert Kanigher; Joe Kubert

In-story information
- Alter ego: Denise de Sevigne

Harpy is a comic book supervillain in DC Comics.

== Publication history ==
The first Harpy was a World War I aviator named Denise de Sevigne and foe of Hans Von Hammer, the Enemy Ace. She first appeared in Star-Spangled War Stories #140 (September 1968), and was created by Robert Kanigher and Joe Kubert.

== Fictional character biography ==
Countess Denise de Sevigne is the sister of Andre de Sevigne, perhaps the fiercest enemy of Hans von Hammer, a.k.a. Enemy Ace. She had conflicting feelings about Hammer, but eventually decided to become a flying ace on her own in order to avenge her brother's death, taking the codename of Harpy.
