= Stormbringer (video game) =

1987 video game

- Developer: David Jones
- Publisher: Mastertronic (on the M.A.D. label)
- Platforms: ZX Spectrum (48K and 128K versions), Commodore 64, Amstrad CPC, MSX, Atari ST
- Release: 1987, 1988
- Genres: Platform, adventure
- Mode: Single-player

Stormbringer is a video game written by David Jones and released in 1987 by Mastertronic on the Mastertronic Added Dimension label. It was originally released on the ZX Spectrum, Commodore 64, Amstrad CPC, and MSX. A version for the Atari ST was published in 1988. It is the fourth and final game in the Magic Knight series. The in-game music is by David Whittaker.

== Plot ==
Magic Knight returns home, having obtained a second-hand time machine from the Tyme Guardians at the end of Knight Tyme. However, there has been an accident whilst travelling back and there are now two Magic Knights - the other being "Off-White Knight", the dreaded Stormbringer (so called because of his storm cloud which he plans to use to destroy Magic Knight). Magic Knight cannot kill Off-White Knight without destroying himself in the process. His only option is to find Off-White Knight and merge with him.

== Gameplay ==
Gameplay takes the form of a graphic adventure, with commands being inputted via the "Windimation" menu-driven interface, in the style of the previous two games, Spellbound and Knight Tyme (1986).

Magic Knight again has a limited amount of strength which is consumed by performing actions and moving from screen to screen as well as being sapped by various enemies such as the Stormbringer's storm cloud and spinning axes and balls that bounce around some rooms and should be avoided. The need for the player to monitor Magic Knight's strength and avoid enemies means that Stormbringer's gameplay is closer to the action-adventure feel of Spellbound rather than the much more pure graphic adventure feel of Knight Tyme.

As with the previous two Magic Knight games, there are characters with whom Magic Knight can interact and have help him. Magic Knight's spellcasting abilities are also important for solving the game's puzzles including the "merge" spell to be used when he finds Off-White Knight.

== Reception ==
Reception

Awards
Publication	Award
Computer and Video Games	C+VG Hit
Your Sinclair	Megagame
