= Knight Tyme =

1986 video game

- Developers: David Jones; David Whittaker; Rob Hubbard (music)
- Publisher: Mastertronic
- Platforms: Amstrad CPC, Commodore 64, MSX, ZX Spectrum (separate 48K and 128K versions)
- Release: 1986
- Genre: Graphic adventure
- Mode: Single-player

Knight Tyme is a computer game released for the ZX Spectrum, Amstrad CPC, Commodore 64 and MSX compatibles in 1986. It was published by Mastertronic as part of their Mastertronic Added Dimension label. Two versions of the ZX Spectrum release were published: a full version for the 128K Spectrum (which was published first) and a cut-down version for the 48K Spectrum that removed the music, some graphics and some locations (which was published later).

It was programmed by David Jones and is the third game in the Magic Knight series. The in-game music was written by David Whittaker on the C64 version and Rob Hubbard on the Spectrum and Amstrad versions. Graphics were by Ray Owen.

== Plot ==
Having rescued his friend Gimbal the wizard from a self-inflicted white-out spell, the Magic Knight finds himself transported into the far future aboard the starship USS Pisces. Magic Knight must find a way back to his own time, with the help of the Tyme Guardians, before he is apprehended by the Paradox Police. On board the USS Pisces, the Magic Knight is first not recognized at all by the crew of the ship, and must create an ID Card, which he receives a template of from Derby IV, the ship's main computer. After getting his ID completed, he then takes command of the ship, first arriving at Starbase 1 to refuel the ship. After refueling, the Magic Knight collects the pieces of the Golden Sundial from Monopole, Retreat and Outpost. Returning to the ship with all the pieces of the sundial, he discovers that a time machine has appeared inside the USS Pisces to take him back to his own time.

== Gameplay ==
Gameplay is similar to Knight Tyme's predecessor, Spellbound. Once again, the game's wide range of commands are carried out using "Windimation", a system whereby text commands are carried out through choosing options in command windows.

The importance of watching Magic Knight's energy level and keeping him from harm is rather different this time around. Whilst Spellbound required the player to be vigilant about his health and needed the player to occasionally avoid flying objects that could sap his strength, Knight Tyme is much more focused on the puzzle-solving aspect (although there are still some "death rooms" as in Spellbound). For this reason, it should be regarded as a true graphic adventure.

As before, the gameworld features a large number of characters that the player can interact with. This time around, however, he is not so responsible for their welfare and they are more there to help him on his quest. They do, after all, belong to the time Magic Knight has found himself in. He is the only displaced person this time around.

Knight Tyme also involves some space travel, with Magic Knight commandeering the USS Pisces and using it to journey to various planets and star systems. All of these planets can be communicated with and some can be beamed down to via the USS Pisces transporter system. Magic Knight also needs to keep note of the ship's fuel as if it runs out both he and the starship will be stranded which means the end of the game. Refuelling can take place at many of the planets the USS Pisces visits.

== Reception ==
Reception

Awards
Publication	Award
Crash	Crash Smash
Your Sinclair	Megagame
Amstrad Action	Mastergame

== Sequels ==
One further Magic Knight game, Stormbringer, was released in 1987.
