= Van Hulthem Manuscript =

Medieval Dutch literature

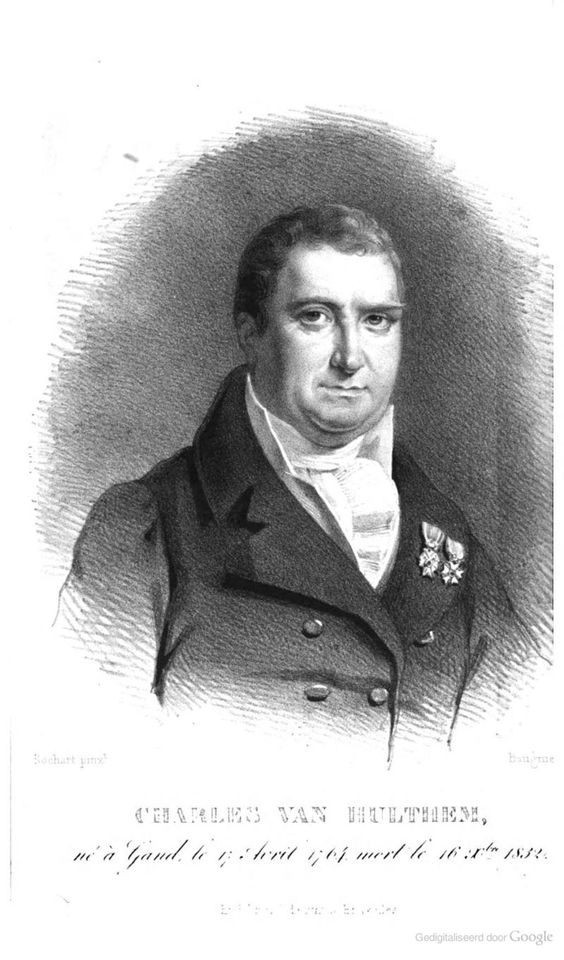
Charles van Hulthem, after whom the manuscript was named

The Van Hulthem Manuscript is a masterpiece of medieval Dutch literature, probably compiled in the Duchy of Brabant. It contains over 200 stories from across the Low Countries.

The manuscript is named after its last private owner, Charles van Hulthem of Ghent. It is in the collection of the Royal Library of Belgium.

This manuscript contains the only known versions of the famous abele spelen ("able plays"), some of the earliest secular drama surviving from medieval Europe.
