= ESafety =

ESafety, eSafety or e-safety may refer to:

- Internet safety
- the Australian eSafety Commissioner
- the eSafety Forum or eSafety Initiative, components of the Intelligent Car Initiative European Commission policy framework
