= Online Safety Amendment =

Online Safety Amendment may refer to:

- Online Safety Amendment (Digital Duty of Care) Bill 2026
- Online Safety Amendment (Social Media Minimum Age) Act 2024
