= Leonardo Puglisi =

Australian journalist (born 2007)

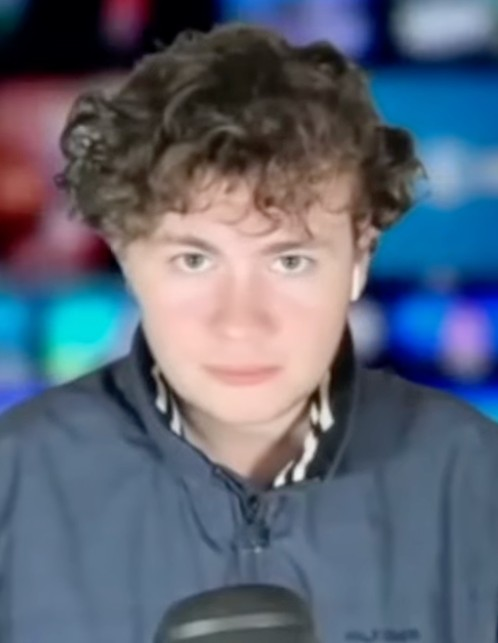
- Puglisi in June 2026
- Born: 12 November 2007 (age 19); Melbourne, Victoria, Australia
- Education: 2013–2019: Hawthorn West Primary School; 2020–2025: Secondary school
- Occupations: Journalist, news presenter
- Years active: 2019–present
- Employer: Self employed
- Known for: Founding 6 News Australia

Leonardo Puglisi (/pʌɡˈliːsi/ pug-lee-see; born 12 November 2007) is an Australian journalist. He is the founder of online news channel 6 News Australia. He lives in Melbourne, Victoria.

== Career ==
Puglisi began his media career in 2019, founding what was then initially known as HMV Local News but rebranded in 2020 as 6 News. Puglisi first came to attention in 2020 when he covered the secretive demolition of a bell tower at Hawthorn West Primary School in Hawthorn, Victoria.

He has been the subject of a number of conspiracy theories, including that he was a "front" for the Morrison government and that he was being funded by Rupert Murdoch.

Since April 2026, Puglisi has been a regular Crikey contributor. In July 2026, the ownership of 6 News was transferred to Puglisi from Atelier Puglisi Pty Ltd.

=== Notable interviews ===
- Scott Morrison - Prime Minister of Australia (2018–2022), prior to the 2022 federal election
- Anthony Albanese - Prime Minister of Australia (2022–present) (interviewed during his tenure as Opposition Leader prior to the 2022 federal election)
- Kevin Rudd - former Prime Minister of Australia (2007–2010, 2013)
- Bob Katter - member of the House of Representatives for the division of Kennedy
- Fatima Payman - member of the Senate for Western Australia, following her crossing the floor.
- Larissa Waters - then Leader of the Australian Greens

== Advocacy ==
Puglisi is a prominent advocate against the social media age restrictions in Australia. He criticised the lack of consultation with the young people affected by the laws and noted that his career would not exist if the ban had been implemented earlier.

== Personal life ==
Puglisi was born in Melbourne and grew up in Hawthorn, Victoria. He attended Hawthorn West Primary School until 2019, and completed secondary school in 2026. Puglisi is currently studying at University.

Puglisi is a supporter of the Hawthorn Football Club in the Australian Football League (AFL). He also supports the Preston Bullants in the Victorian Football League (VFL), volunteering as the club's media manager in 2024 and 2025, prior to the club entering voluntary liquidation.

== Awards ==
Year	Award	Category	Result	Ref.
2024	Boorondara Youth Awards	Leadership (Junior)	Won	
2025	Young Australian of the Year	Victoria	Nominated	
