= Online Safety Amendment (Social Media Minimum Age) Act 2024 =

Australian legislation

Parliament of Australia
- Long title: An Act to amend the Online Safety Act 2021, and for related purposes
- Citation: Online Safety Amendment (Social Media Minimum Age) Act 2024 (Cth) (No. 127 of 2024)
- Territorial extent: Australia
- Enacted by: House of Representatives
- Enacted by: Senate
- Assented to by: Governor-General Sam Mostyn
- Assented to: 10 December 2024
- Commenced: 11 December 2024
- Administered by: eSafety Commissioner

Legislative history

Initiating chamber: House of Representatives
- Bill title: Online Safety Amendment (Social Media Minimum Age) Bill 2024
- Bill citation: Online Safety Amendment (Social Media Minimum Age) Bill 2024 (Cth)
- Introduced by: Michelle Rowland, Minister for Communications
- Committee responsible: Senate Environment and Communications Legislation
- First reading: 21 November 2024
- Second reading: 25 November 2024
- Voting summary: 96 voted for; 6 voted against; 49 absent
- Considered by the Senate Environment and Communications Legislation Committee: 26 November 2024
- Consideration in detail: 27 November 2024
- Third reading: 27 November 2024
- Voting summary: 101 voted for; 13 voted against; 37 absent
- Passed: 27 November 2024
- Committee report: "Online Safety Amendment (Social Media Minimum Age) Bill 2024 [Provisions] Report – November 2024".

Revising chamber: Senate
- Bill title: Online Safety Amendment (Social Media Minimum Age) Bill 2024
- Received from the House of Representatives: 27 November 2024
- Member(s) in charge: Jenny McAllister
- First reading: 27 November 2024
- Second reading: 28 November 2024
- Voting summary: 34 voted for; 19 voted against; 24 absent
- Third reading: 28 November 2024
- Voting summary: 34 voted for; 19 voted against; 24 absent
- Passed with amendments: 28 November 2024

Final stages
- Senate amendments considered by the House of Representatives: 29 November 2024
- Finally passed both chambers: 29 November 2024

Amends
- Online Safety Act 2021

Related legislation
- Online Safety Amendment (Digital Duty of Care) Bill 2026

Summary
- Bans certain social media platforms for those under the age of 16

Keywords
- Child protection, social media, online communication, age restriction
- Status: Current legislation

The Online Safety Amendment (Social Media Minimum Age) Act 2024 is an Australian act of parliament that prohibits minors under the age of 16 from holding an account on certain social media platforms. It is an amendment to the Online Safety Act 2021 and was passed by the Parliament of Australia on 29 November 2024. It imposes monetary penalties on social media companies that fail to take reasonable steps to prevent minors under 16 who are located in Australia from having accounts on their services.

The legislation allows the government to determine which social media platforms must ban age‑restricted users and proclaim a date for the commencement of the ban, with those provisions taking effect on 10 December 2025. Facebook, Instagram, Reddit, Snapchat, TikTok, Twitter, Threads, Twitch, Kick, and YouTube were age‑restricted on 10 December 2025, with the possibility that more platforms may be added. It was the first such legislation to be passed in the world.

The act is being challenged in the High Court by the Digital Freedom Project.

== Background ==
The ban on access to social media by young people by the federal government originated in November 2023, when shadow communications minister David Coleman introduced a private member's bill requiring the government to conduct a trial for age-verification technology on pornography and social media platforms. The bill did not succeed. The Albanese government funded a trial ban in the 2024 Australian federal budget, after the South Australian Premier Peter Malinauskas had announced his government's intention to ban under-14s from social media. His wife had requested that he read The Anxious Generation by Jonathan Haidt and take action to address the impact of social media on the mental health of children. The couple have four young children, and the premier thought that government should play a part in helping parents to regulate use of social media by their children at home. In June 2024, opposition leader Peter Dutton pledged that a Coalition government would implement a ban on social media for under-16s within 100 days of taking office. In July 2024, prime minister Anthony Albanese announced the government would introduce legislation banning under-16s from social media.

Malinauskas, in the meantime, had contacted former High Court chief justice Robert French, who agreed to look at the issue, and in September 2024 handed the premier a 267-page proposal, which he dubbed a "Swiss Army knife" rather than a machete, to adjust to social media's "changing landscape and its complexity". The leaders of other states and territories gave their support to Malinauskas's idea, and he took the French report to National Cabinet to collaborate with chief ministers, premiers, and the prime minister. In early September 2024, South Australia proposed legislation intended to ban users under the age of 14, and to require parental consent for 14- and 15‑year‑olds. Later in September, prime minister Albanese announced that his government intended to introduce legislation to set a minimum age requirement for social media.

In November 2024, the federal government indicated their intention to engage the Age Check Certification Scheme following a tender process for an age assurance technology trial. The Albanese government's proposed ban was supported by the governments of every state and territory. Albanese described social media as a "scourge", and said "I want people to spend more time on the footy field or the netball court than they're spending on their phones", that family members are "worried sick about the safety of our kids online", and that social media "is having a negative impact on young people's mental health and on anxiety".

The Online Safety Amendment (Social Media Minimum Age) Bill 2024 was introduced into parliament by minister for communications Michelle Rowland on 21 November 2024, passing both houses on 28 November 2024.

Community support swelled after stories of parents who had lost their children to suicide after being bullied on social media were published. Albanese himself was moved by a personal letter received from Kelly O'Brien, whose 12-year-old daughter Charlotte had taken her own life due to bullying at school. An event took place at the sidelines of the United Nations General Assembly session in September 2025 at which a mother spoke of her daughter's suicide as "death by bullying ... enabled by social media". The speech won support from world leaders in Greece, Fiji, Tonga, and the president of the European Commission Ursula von der Leyen.

The opposition organised an open letter signed by 140 experts who specialise in child welfare and technology. The opposition was concerned about the invasion of privacy that will occur with the introduction of identification-based age checks. An advocacy group for digital companies in Australia called the plans a "20th Century response to 21st Century challenges". A director of a mental health service voiced concerns, stating that "73% of young people across Australia who accessed mental health support did so through social media". The government specified in the legislation that an identity document cannot be the only way to verify an account holder's age.

== Legislative history ==
On 21 November 2024, the Online Safety Amendment (Social Media Minimum Age) Bill 2024 was introduced into the federal parliament by the minister for communications, Michelle Rowland. The bill was then referred to the Environment and Communications Legislation Committee of the Senate, which reported its findings on 26 November after having received 15,000 submissions. There was a 24‑hour period for submissions to be made for or against the bill, with the committee stating "due to the short timeframe of this inquiry, the committee would appreciate submissions being limited to 1–2 pages."

=== House of Representatives ===
On 27 November, the House of Representatives passed the Online Safety Amendment (Social Media Minimum Age) Bill 2024 by a vote of 101 in favour, 13 against. The governing Labor Party, all of the Coalition except for Bridget Archer, and four independent MPs voted in favour of the bill. Six independent MPs, all the Greens, Rebekha Sharkie, and Bob Katter voted against.

=== Senate ===
The Senate passed the bill on 27 November 2024, including government amendments, by a vote of 34 in favour, 19 against. The entire crossbench voted against the legislation, along with Alex Antic and Matt Canavan of the Liberal and National Party, respectively. The House of Representatives then passed the bill again with these amendments.

The legislation was the world-first social media ban for youth.

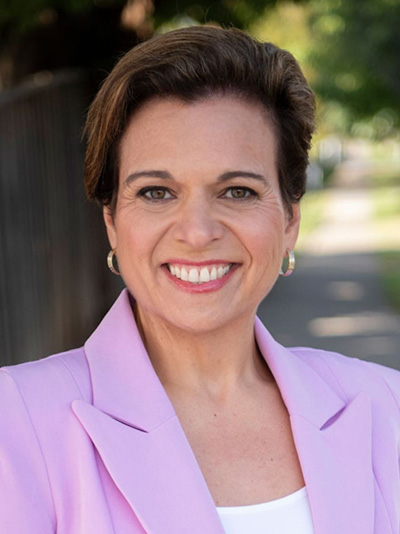
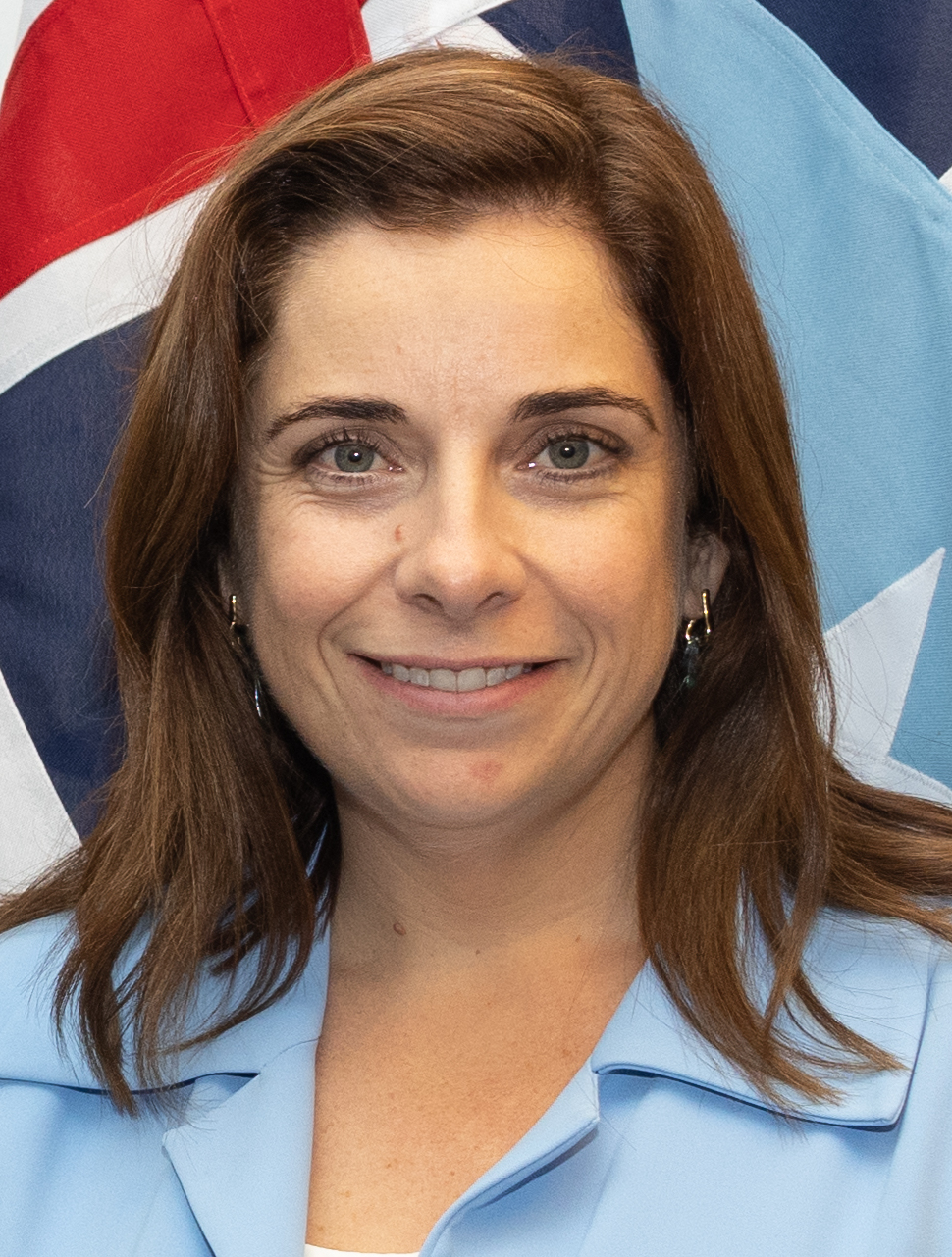
Michelle Rowland (left, Minister who introduced the bill) and Anika Wells (right, current Minister for Communications)

== Implementation ==
Social media companies received a transition period of one year after the legislation is enacted to introduce reasonable controls preventing minors under the age of 16 from holding accounts on their services while physically located in Australia. Enforcement involves fines of up to A$49.5 million for companies failing to take such steps, with no consequences for parents and children who violate the restrictions. There are no parental consent exceptions to the ban, and while the use of virtual private networks (VPNs) to access these services remains legal in Australia, the services are expected to try to stop under 16s from using VPNs to pretend to be outside Australia. The expectation is to make best-efforts to implement the ban on platforms including Facebook, Instagram, Reddit, Snapchat, TikTok, Twitter, Threads, Twitch, Kick and YouTube.

Some social media companies are obligated to become good enough at profiling Australian children under 16 to satisfy the Australian government they tried to implement the ban to avoid being fined. Consequently, social media companies said they would try to identify restricted users using various methods, including behavioural inferencing. On 5 November 2025, it was announced that online gaming platform Roblox would not be banned, but Reddit and live-streaming platform Kick was added to the list of platforms to be banned.

A report by Age Check Certification Scheme, a UK company recruited by the government to consult on the technology used to implement the restrictions, was issued in June 2025, ahead of the December deadline to implement the ban. In June 2025, the preliminary report was released, which stated that "there are no significant technological barriers" to implementing the ban.

In late July 2025, Google warned that it would sue the Australian Government if YouTube was included in the ban. On 30 July, the government announced that it would extend its social media age limit to include YouTube, following advice from Grant. On 30 July 2025, the minister for communications, Anika Wells, published the Online Safety (Age-Restricted Social Media Platforms) Rules 2025, which specify exactly which types of social media platforms will be banned for certain users.

On 31 August 2025, the full report was released, which stated that it would technically be possible to implement the ban; however, coordination among different services is required to successfully implement it. It also highlighted the benefits and flaws of different methods of age verification. On 16 September 2025, it was announced that the eSafety Commissioner will be able to take legal action against social media companies that have not pursued reasonable steps to bar users under the age of 16, and that fines can range up to A$49.5 million against these companies in court.

On 19 November 2025, Meta announced that from 4 December their platforms (Instagram, Facebook, and Threads) would be removing users under the age of 16 ahead of the 10 December deadline. Users will be able to scan a face or provide an identity document to prove their age. On 21 November 2025, the eSafety Commissioner announced that the live-streaming platform Twitch will be included in the ban, but that Pinterest would not be.

In December 2025, eSafety Commissioner Julie Inman Grant suggested efforts to block users include use by social media companies of various "signals" to identify children that are physically located in Australia and in the target age range, for the purpose of countering "location-based [... and] aged-based circumvention". Grant also commented that costs for suitable VPNs are "in the thousands of dollars" and therefore out of reach of most teenagers, despite VPNs being available for less than A$20 per month.

=== Platforms affected ===
Grant has stated that there would not be a static list of age-restricted platforms, due to changing services and technology.

As of 21 November 2025, the following platforms are required to implement age restrictions:

- Facebook
- Instagram
- Kick
- Reddit
- Snapchat
- Threads
- TikTok
- Twitch
- Twitter
- YouTube

As of 21 November 2025, the following platforms were considered by Grant but ultimately are not required to implement age restrictions:

- Discord
- GitHub
- Google Classroom
- Lego Play
- Messenger
- Pinterest
- Roblox
- Steam (including Steam Chat)
- WhatsApp
- YouTube Kids

Based on individual companies' own assessments, the following platforms are also blocked:

- Azar
- BandLab
- Bigo Live
- Bluesky
- Hinge
- Lemon8
- Match.com
- OkCupid
- Plenty of Fish
- Wizz
- Yubo
- Tinder

== Reactions ==
An official at Meta, the parent company of Facebook, Instagram and WhatsApp, stated that the company would comply with any laws regarding age restrictions for children in Australia. Snap, the owner of Snapchat, also confirmed its intention to comply with the legislation. Meta stated that they would prefer mobile app store operators (Apple's App Store and Google's Play Store) verify a user's age rather than having the onus fall to individual platforms.

Meta alerted users under the age of 16 to back up their data before the ban, giving them options to update contact information, delete their account, or back up their data. Former High Court judge Robert French welcomed the passage of the legislation, describing it as "the basic sensible model". French had previously contributed to a review of similar proposed legislation in South Australia. Advocacy group 36 Months supports the ban but opposes the inclusion of YouTube in the ban's scope.

The newspapers owned by News Corp Australia (Note: Those including: The Australian (national), The Weekend Australian (national), The Daily Telegraph (published in New South Wales), The Sunday Telegraph (published in New South Wales), Herald Sun (published in Victoria), Sunday Herald Sun (published in Victoria), The Courier-Mail (published in Queensland), The Sunday Mail (published in Queensland), The Advertiser (published in South Australia), Sunday Mail (South Australia-based), The Mercury (published in Tasmania), The Sunday Tasmanian, Northern Territory News, and The Sunday Territorian) ran a campaign titled Let Them Be Kids that publicised the experiences of parents losing their children to suicide as a result of bullying taking place on social media and aimed to introduce a social media age limit. In December 2025, most teenagers that Guardian Australia interviewed were opposed to the ban and expressed a skepticism towards the ban's effectiveness.

Parents have been frustrated at the ban's lack of effectiveness.

Inman Grant has said she was "not really keen on" the ban and criticised the rushed legislation as "very thin scaffolding".

Apple CEO Tim Cook said that Australia's social media ban partly inspired new child safety features that were included with iOS 27.

In February 2026, Guardian Australia reported that teenagers under the age of 16 were still able to access some social media platforms, however others felt more isolated from communication and some have found vastly different content on their feeds.

=== International ===
As of July 2026, Indonesia, Malaysia, Brazil and China have enacted similar bans. Canada, Denmark, Greece, Austria, Spain, and the United Kingdom have announced similar bans. Proposed bans in Greece and Turkey apply to minors under 15 instead of under 16, and Austria's proposal applies to individuals under 14. France's proposed ban was written struck down by a ruling by the Constitutional Council. New Zealand has also proposed a ban after an earlier bill known as the Social Media (Age-Restricted Users) Bill failed in Parliament.

=== Public opinion ===
An opinion poll conducted by YouGov in November 2024 found that 77% of Australians supported the age limit. Polling by The Sydney Morning Herald's Resolve Political Monitor in December 2024 showed that 58% of respondents supported the policy. However, only 25% believed it would work, compared to 67% who thought it would not achieve its aims. Similar polling in December 2025 indicated that 70% of voters endorsed the ban, while 15% opposed it. A majority (53%) of parents planned to selectively allow platforms for their children, 29% intended full compliance, and 13% said they would take no action. Confidence in the ban's effectiveness remained low, with 58% not confident compared to 33% who were fully confident.

An opinion poll published on 10 December 2025 by Essential Research found that support was at 57% which is a decrease from 69% support in July 2024. Opposition increased from 14% in July 2024 to 22% in December 2025. 66% thought the ban would be somewhat or fully effective while 34% did not have faith in the legislation's effectiveness. Behind the News, an ABC news program for children and teenagers, ran a poll on its website in November 2025, in which over 17,000 people in the age range participated. The results were revealed on 2 December, during the program's final episode of 2025, showing that a majority of the participants use YouTube, followed by Roblox, both leading by large margins followed by TikTok, Snapchat, Discord, Instagram, Facebook, Reddit and X in decreasing order. When asked "Do you plan to stop using social media once the ban comes in?", 75% responded No, against 25% responding Yes. When asked "Do you think the social media ban is a good idea?", 70% responded No, 21% responded Not sure and 9% responded Yes.

=== Criticism ===
The Law Council raised concerns about the implementation of the law, stating that the scope of the legislation is too broad and poses risks to privacy and human rights. The Privacy Commissioner, Carly Kind, expressed skepticism about the legislation. The Digital Industry Group voiced concerns about the implementation and potential impacts of the legislation. TikTok described the legislation as "rushed" and warned it could push younger users into "darker corners of the internet". CEO of Snapchat Evan Spiegel said that parents have other methods of enforcement such as screen time limits on iOS.

Leonardo Puglisi, founder of the youth-run news outlet 6 News Australia, has been a vocal critic of the legislation. He also criticised the lack of consultation with affected young people. Associate Professor Faith Gordon from the Australian National University argued that social media companies should have an "enforced duty of care" rather than being subject to outright bans. Concerns have been raised that LGBTQ+ and neurodivergent teens, as well as those in rural areas, could be cut off from communicating with peers in similar situations. In June 2025, ABC News reported that available age-verification systems did not always accurately detect a user's age. After the ban came into effect on 10 December 2025, ABC News reported that "many children have already been able to get around the ban in various ways".

=== Legal action ===
On 26 November 2025, the Digital Freedom Project announced it would commence legal action in the High Court against the new law, arguing that it violates the implied freedom of political communication in the Constitution. The action is being managed by former Liberal Party candidate for Warringah, Katherine Deves, through the law firm Pryor Tzannes & Wallis. On 4 December 2025, the High Court agreed to hear the Digital Freedom Project's challenge. The case will proceed under a special directions hearing, with arguments scheduled for 2026, the earliest available date being February. The president of the Digital Freedom Project is John Ruddick, Libertarian member of the New South Wales Legislative Council. Two 15-year-olds Macy Neyland and Noah Jones are named as plaintiffs in this challenge to the law.

The state governments of New South Wales, South Australia, and Western Australia announced that they would oppose the Digital Freedom Project's challenge. In addition to the Digital Freedom Project's challenge, Reddit is pursuing separate legal action in the High Court, with barrister Perry Herzfeld leading the case on behalf of law firm Thomson Geer. Reddit's case also says "a person under the age of 16 can be more easily protected from online harm if they have an account, being the very thing that is prohibited" and says the law violates the Constitution by restricting political discourse of young people. Reddit also argues that it should be out of scope because it is a forum more oriented to adults. An initial hearing could be held by February 2026 with a judgement being made later in the year.

In regard to legal action, a government spokesperson stated that "the Albanese government is on the side of Australian parents and kids, not platforms"; minister Wells stated "we will not yield to intimidation. We will not be deterred by legal disputes"; and eSafety commissioner Grant stated "if the court makes a decision, we'll abide by it. It may be that the Commonwealth wins. It may be that some changes need to be made to the policy. Who knows? I'm just going to move forward, given there hasn't been any legal constraint placed on us." Google is also considering a legal challenge.

In late March 2026, communications minister Anika Wells confirmed that the Australian government would investigate Facebook, Instagram, Snapchat, TikTok and YouTube for potential violations of the under-16 social media ban. The eSafety Commissioner accused them of allowing children who had already declared themselves under-age to make repeated attempts at age verification. Additionally, there were insufficient measures to prevent the creation of new accounts for users under 16. If found guilty, the social media companies will face a $49.5 million fine.

== Post-implementation ==
On 25 June 2026, prime minister Anthony Albanese indicated that the government is looking at ways to strengthen this legislation. Albanese highlighted the increasing use of artificial intelligence (AI) apps, saying "We're seeing increased presentations in our hospitals of young women who have been choked, strangled" and that the government is considering the eSafety Commissioner's recent comments on the policy. On 27 June, Albanese said that the government was considering increasing the fine to $99 million and strengthening the powers of the eSafety Commissioner, he also criticised technology companies for failing to effectively enforce the ban and said that powers will be to compel technology companies will be extended to include app stores and age assurance providers.

== See also ==
- Bipartisanship § Australia
- Internet privacy
- Internet safety
- Mass surveillance in Australia
- Moral panic
- Online Safety Act 2023 – UK law to regulate online content
- Social media age verification laws in the United States
- Online age verification laws by country
- Social media regulation
- Privacy in Australian law
- Protecting Americans from Foreign Adversary Controlled Applications Act – United States legislation regarding social media platform TikTok
- Children's Online Privacy Protection Act – 2000 American federal cyber law
