= The Daily Aus =

Australian social media-based news outlet

- Type: Independent digital media
- Format: Social media; newsletters; podcasts
- Founders: Sam Koslowski; Zara Seidler
- Editor-in-chief: Billi FitzSimons
- Founded: 2017
- Political alignment: Non-partisan
- Headquarters: Sydney, New South Wales, Australia
- Readership: 2.5 million
- Website: thedailyaus.com.au

The Daily Aus (TDA) is an Australian social media-based news outlet founded in 2017 by Sam Koslowski and Zara Seidler. It is focused on delivering news and current affairs to young Australians aged 18–35, using a social-first, plain English editorial approach across Instagram, TikTok, daily email newsletters, and podcasts. It is widely regarded as Australia's leading social-first youth news organisation, reaching approximately 2.5 million Australians per month across its platforms.

The Daily Aus operates as an independent media company, unaffiliated with any larger media group. Their editorial focus is on issues relevant to young Australians, as 85% of its audience is under 35 years old. The organisation also operates Futureproof, a youth strategy advisory arm providing research and consulting services to corporate and government clients. As of March 2026, the company has 25 employees.

== Publishing and audience ==
The Daily Aus primarily posts news content to its Instagram and TikTok accounts and its website. Every weekday morning, the publication also sends out an email newsletter and releases a new podcast episode. Their news content is "bite-sized" and "easily digestible", written in plain English, with its stories catered specifically towards a young Generation Z audience. The outlet reports that 85% of its audience is under the age of 35, and 70% cite The Daily Aus as their primary news source.

== History and growth ==
=== Founding (2017–2020) ===
You should be able to scroll on social media, see a photo of a coffee, a brand you like, and then a little, digestible explainer of ours about interest rates before going back to what you’re doing more knowledgeably.

— Sam Koslowski

The Daily Aus was founded by Sam Koslowski and Zara Seidler in 2017. Seidler graduated with a Bachelor of Arts from the University of Sydney and worked as a news producer at Sky News and as a government officer. Koslowski worked as a corporate lawyer at a law firm, and was previously a social media journalist at Fox Sports Australia. In February 2021, they both quit their jobs to work at the company full-time. In 2020, the two entrepreneurs appeared in Forbes 30 Under 30 list for Media, Marketing & Advertising.

TDA's founding premise was that Instagram, TikTok, and podcast platforms were not marketing channels, but primary news homes for the 18–35 demographic. The business was social-first from inception, building its initial audience on Instagram with short-form explainer posts written without assumed knowledge, partisan framing, or opinion. The founders deliberately rejected the creator-as-influencer model, positioning TDA as a brand-led newsroom rather than a personality-driven content channel.

From 2017 to 2020, the two founders posted daily to the outlet's Instagram account while maintaining separate full-time careers. After three years of consistent publishing, the Instagram account had accumulated approximately 3,000 followers.

=== Growth and expansion (2020–2022) ===
In 2020, The Daily Aus rapidly grew its Instagram following through its coverage of four key events: COVID-19 lockdowns and restrictions in Australia, the Black Summer bushfires, the George Floyd protests and the US presidential election. The founders attributed their growth in readership to young audiences "going to Instagram for the basic information before they go out to more sophisticated news sources for further reading."

In February 2021, Koslowski and Seidler both resigned from their respective careers to work at TDA full-time. Following this transition, the outlet's audience grew rapidly; its Instagram following grew from approximately 100,000 to 270,000 between July 2021 and December 2021.

In March 2022, TDA appointed its first official editor, Billi FitzSimons, the daughter of Lisa Wilkinson and Peter FitzSimons.

In April 2022, the news outlet partnered with the iHeart Podcast Network to handle the production of their two podcasts, The Daily Aus and No Silly Questions.

In June 2022, TDA closed a $1.2 million seed funding round led by former Nine Entertainment Co. chief executive David Gyngell, with participation from Canva executives Zach Kitschke and Rob Kawalsky, and events company Untitled Group. The founders announced the capital would be used to expand the newsroom and deepen audience data capabilities for commercial partners.

In September 2022, the two founders appeared in Forbes Asia 30 Under 30 list for Media, Marketing & Advertising.

=== Newsletters and vertical expansion (2023–present) ===
From 2023, TDA expanded from its flagship daily newsletter into a suite of topic-specific newsletter verticals. These include a sport newsletter, which surpassed 50,000 daily subscribers within one year of launch; a good news newsletter launched in partnership with travel company Intrepid Travel; a weekly culture newsletter (TDA Culture); and a finance newsletter, launched in May 2025, focused on economic news written for a non-specialist audience.

In June 2023, amidst the online presale for the Australian leg of Taylor Swift's Eras Tour, TDA advertised a giveaway of four tickets to a random follower of their page. In a few hours, their account gained 20,000 followers. However, Frontier Touring, who was running the presale, later sent a cease and desist to the publication as tickets were not to be used as competition prizes. TDA was forced to remove their original post and issued an apology to readers that afternoon.

In September 2023, Koslowski and Seidler co-authored No Silly Questions: The Daily Aus explains how the world works (and why you should care), published by Penguin Life (an imprint of Penguin Books Australia). The book provides accessible explanations of economic, political, and social concepts for a general audience, consistent with the outlet's editorial approach.

In 2024, Koslowski and Seidler were listed in Forbes Australia's inaugural 30 Under 30 list.

In 2025, TDA expanded its editorial offering across five content verticals — News, Sport, Finance, Good News, and Culture — each with dedicated newsletters, social presence, and commercial inventory. By mid-2025, TDA's combined newsletter portfolio reached more than 310,000 unique subscribers, with an average daily open rate exceeding 50 per cent — approximately double the industry average.

TDA confirmed its first profitable year in 2025, making it one of a small number of independent digital news publishers in Australia to achieve sustained commercial viability without reliance on philanthropic or public funding. Koslowski described the organisation as having "totally inverted the revenue mix" from social media to newsletters over a two-year period.

In November 2025, TDA announced two high-profile recruits to its leadership team — Mia Stern as Head of Operations from Nine Entertainment, and Tom Edmonds as Head of Partnerships from Nova Entertainment.

== Content and products ==
=== Newsletters ===
The Daily Aus publishes a flagship morning newsletter, distributed Monday to Friday, summarising key Australian and international news stories in plain English. As of 2025, the flagship morning newsletter has more than 200,000 subscribers. The portfolio also includes vertical newsletters focused on sport, finance, culture, and good news. All newsletters are published via Beehiiv.

In 2025, TDA won Newsletter of the Year at the 2025 Asia Awards of the World Association of News Publishers (WAN-IFRA), and was nominated as one of the top three newsletters globally alongside The Telegraph and the Financial Times.

=== Podcasts ===
The Daily Aus podcast is a daily weekday news briefing, launched in 2021. It has charted consistently among the top Australian daily news podcasts on Apple Podcasts and Spotify and is distributed in partnership with the iHeart Podcast Network Australia. The outlet also publishes the companion podcast No Silly Questions, based on the founders' book of the same name.

=== Social media ===
The Daily Aus operates accounts on Instagram, TikTok, YouTube, and X. Its Instagram account, @thedailyaus, has approximately 650,000 followers as of 2026 and is the outlet's primary audience acquisition channel. The outlet is notable for producing news explainers in a visual tile format suitable for mobile consumption, and for its high audience engagement rate relative to comparable media accounts.

In 2026, TDA was cited by FT Strategies in a global report examining consumption of news by Generation Z. The report found TDA was a global leader in platform-specific news coverage,

Rather than competing to break stories first, it focuses on clarity and context, publishing explainers through carousel cards or video explainer content. This steady, structured cadence positions The Daily Aus as a trusted, low-noise brand that prioritizes quality comprehension over the quantity of updates.

=== Video ===
The Daily Aus produces short-form video news content for TikTok and YouTube, styled as visual explainers aimed at first-time news consumers. The outlet has also produced branded video series for commercial partners, including the Adulting 101 series produced with car insurance company Rollin.

== Editorial model ==
TDA's journalism is built on four core principles: factual accuracy, neutrality, accessibility, and no assumed knowledge. Each piece of content is designed to explain context as well as events, starting from first principles so that readers with no prior exposure to a topic can understand it. This approach is particularly important in TDA's coverage of politics, economics, international affairs, and public health.

The organisation maintains a strict separation between editorial and commercial functions. An editorial policy, distributed to both staff and investors, formalises this independence. Commercial deals that require editorial compromise are declined as a policy matter. TDA's founders have publicly described this commercial discipline as a trust-reinforcing mechanism: the willingness to turn down advertisers is itself a signal of editorial integrity.

=== Exclusives ===
In August 2025, The Daily Aus published an exclusive interview with Mitch Brown, a former West Coast Eagles player who appeared in 94 AFL games between 2007 and 2016. Brown came out as bisexual in the interview, becoming the first male player in the 129-year history of the Australian Football League to publicly identify as gay or bisexual. In the interview, Brown described the "hyper-masculine" culture he experienced during his playing career and said his sexuality had been a factor in his decision to retire. AFL chief executive Andrew Dillon called the disclosure "an important moment" for the game and praised Brown for his "great courage". The story was picked up by international outlets including NBC News, PinkNews, and Out.com, and was cited by academics writing on LGBTQIA+ inclusion in Australian sport.

=== Political Interviews ===
The Daily Aus has established itself as a destination for senior Australian political figures seeking to reach young voters. Prime Minister Anthony Albanese has appeared on The Daily Aus podcast multiple times, with transcripts published on the official Prime Minister's website, and has agreed to a proposed youth-media-hosted leaders' debate organised by the outlet ahead of the 2025 Australian federal election. Both former prime minister Scott Morrison and opposition leader Peter Dutton declined interview requests from the outlet ahead of the 2022 and 2025 elections respectively; following Dutton's defeat, TDA noted that every federal leader who had refused to engage with them had gone on to lose their election.

TDA has also interviewed Australia's Governor-General Sam Mostyn, opposition leaders Sussan Ley and Angus Taylor, National Party leader David Littleproud, Greens leader Adam Bandt, Foreign Minister Penny Wong, Minister for Youth Anne Aly, Minister for Climate Change and Energy Chris Bowen, Housing Minister Clare O'Neil, Education Minister Jason Clare, Minister for Women Katy Gallagher, Australian of the Year recipients Richard Scolyer, Dylan Alcott, and Katherine Bennell-Pegg, Victorian Premier Jacinta Allan, NSW Premier Chris Minns, former U.S. Ambassador to Australia Caroline Kennedy, and eSafety Commissioner Julie Inman Grant.

In 2023, TDA was the only Australian outlet to secure a one-on-one interview with Biden White House Press Secretary Karine Jean-Pierre and National Security Council Spokesperson John Kirby during the 2023 State Visit of Prime Minister Anthony Albanese.

== Business model ==
The Daily Aus generates revenue through brand partnerships and sponsored content integrated into its newsletters, social media, and podcast. Commercial partners have included the Commonwealth Bank of Australia, Nike, Australian Electoral Commission, Optus, Employment Hero, Intrepid Travel, and Deakin University.

The company maintains a stated policy of editorial independence from commercial arrangements. Editorial and commercial content are handled by separate teams.

In 2025, TDA entered the events category, launching its first advertiser event which was attended by brand partners and generated attributable downstream commercial deals. In 2026, TDA launched the 'TDA IRL' event series with Fujifilm.

TDA has been cited in comparison with international analogues including Morning Brew (acquired by Axel Springer for approximately US$75 million), Semafor (valued at approximately US$330 million in a 2026 private round), and The Free Press (valued at approximately US$150 million in 2025) as evidence of a viable and valuable model for profitable, trust-based digital news.

== Futureproof ==
In 2025, The Daily Aus formally launched Futureproof, a youth strategy advisory arm offering research, consulting, and keynote services to ASX100 companies, large private sector organisations, and government clients. Futureproof draws on audience polling data collected by TDA across its newsletter and Instagram, gathering audience insights on political, economic, and social questions.

Futureproof's services include strategic advisory engagements, brand and communications consulting, and a research product — The Future According to Us - produced in partnership with Resolve Strategic using a nationally representative panel of Australians aged 18–35.

== Civic engagement ==
The Daily Aus has partnered with the Australian Electoral Commission (AEC) on youth electoral enrolment campaigns. Ahead of the 2025 Australian federal election, the national youth enrolment rate among eligible voters aged 18–24 reached 92 per cent — an increase from 85.4 per cent at the 2022 election — a result the AEC described as "extremely healthy".

In the lead-up to the 2023 Australian Indigenous Voice referendum, The Daily Aus partnered with outdoor advertising company JCDecaux to promote an online information hub set up by the news outlet to answer common questions about the proposed alteration to the constitution.

A significant and growing share of TDA's revenue derives from partnerships with government agencies that engage TDA to communicate public-interest information to the 18–35 demographic. These campaigns include public health messaging, electoral enrolment campaigns (with the Australian Electoral Commission), financial literacy programs (with ASIC), and consumer awareness campaigns.

=== Social media regulation ===
In 2024, TDA made a formal submission to the Australian Parliament's Joint Committee on Social Media and Australian Society. The submission addressed the implications of Meta's decision to exit deals under the News Media Bargaining Code (NMBC) and the potential consequences of a ban on news content on Meta's platforms.

TDA's submission argued that a Meta news ban would disproportionately harm independent, social-first news organisations — such as TDA — that received none of the financial benefits of NMBC commercial deals but would suffer all of the distributional consequences of a ban.

TDA's recommendations to the Committee included: revising the NMBC to ensure fair treatment of independent publishers; safeguarding news access on social platforms where no commercial agreement exists; supporting independent journalism through targeted grants; and establishing a Digital Media Literacy Fund targeted at young Australians.

TDA is a vocal critic of the original architecture of the News Media Bargaining Code, arguing that the Code's design entrenched the dominance of large legacy media organisations (Nine Entertainment, News Corp, Seven West Media) at the expense of smaller, independent, and digitally-native outlets. In an appearance in front of the Joint Committee on Social Media and Australian Society, TDA noted that, despite meeting eligibility criteria, it has never received commercial funding from Meta under the Code.

The submission referenced Meta's own 2022 submission to the Treasury review of the Code, which stated that the NMBC incentivises an over-reliance on large news publishers at the expense of smaller and potentially more innovative publishers. TDA's submission described this as consistent with its own experience.

== Criticism and controversy ==
=== Audience perception of bias ===
Despite the company's commitment to neutrality and factual reporting, a subset of audience members have raised concerns about perceived bias in coverage of particular topics, alleging both left-wing and right-wing bias.

A 2023 academic study by Dr Susan Carland of Monash University, commissioned by Islamophobia Register Australia, examined Instagram coverage of the Israel-Gaza war across six major Australian news outlets between 7 October and 7 November 2023. The Daily Aus was selected as one of the six outlets, alongside ABC News, The Australian, The Daily Telegraph, 9News, and News.com.au, on the basis of its 508,000 Instagram followers at the time of the study. The report found TDA was "relatively balanced and mostly consistent in their use of the active voice when describing attacks by both Israel and Hamas" across its posts on the conflict, and used "almost no descriptive or emotive terms for either the Israeli or Palestinian experience."

The report noted that the outlet's text-based format meant it did not produce "humanising stories" meeting the study criteria for either side of the conflict. In a piece accompanying the report in The Conversation, Carland said "five of the six outlets we studied (all bar The Daily Aus) were unbalanced against Palestinians in their Instagram posts in at least one of the three categories we assessed (along with humanisation and grammar, we also looked at descriptive language)".

=== Platform dependency risk ===
As a social-first publisher, The Daily Aus has expressed public concern about its dependence on Meta for audience distribution. In March 2024, Meta announced it would stop paying Australian news publishers for content on Facebook; in April 2024, Meta closed its Facebook News tab in Australia. Koslowski stated that a 50% revenue cut resulting from removal from Meta platforms "would necessitate staff redundancies, limit our ability to provide free news, and stifle future growth". In response, the organisation accelerated its strategy of migrating audiences from social platforms to owned channels, particularly its newsletter portfolio.

=== Transparency Over Commercial Sponsors ===
In May 2026, alternative platform Lamestream revealed TDA published advertorials for its client the Housing Industry Association during the 2026 Federal Budget. The outlet also went on to discover TDA had also been promoting a festival but failed to disclose the ownership stake in that event.

== See also ==
- Social media as a news source
