= Lego Club Magazine =

Official Lego magazine

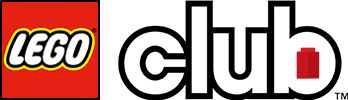
- Categories: Lego
- Frequency: Up to every other month
- Founded: 1974; 52 years ago (as Bricks 'n' Pieces); 1987; 39 years ago (as Brick Kicks); 2002; 24 years ago (as Lego Magazine)
- Final issue: January/February 2017 (merged into Lego Life)
- Company: The Lego Group
- Country: Various worldwide
- Language: Multiple

Lego Club Magazine (formerly known as simply Lego Magazine until 2008) is a defunct magazine that served as the official publication for Lego and the Lego Club. Prior to 2002, it was published as various magazines in different countries, such as Brick Kicks and Lego Mania Magazine in the US and Bricks 'n' Pieces in the UK. The magazine features a range of content including information about Lego products, special offers, comics, games, contests, and modeling tips. In early 2017, Lego Club Magazine concluded with its final issue and was eventually rebranded as LEGO Life Magazine.

== See also ==
- List of magazines in Denmark
