= Digital duty of care in Australia =

Proposed social media reforms in Australia

Online Safety Amendment (Digital Duty of Care) Bill 2026

Parliament of Australia
- Long title: A Bill for an Act to amend the law relating to online safety, and for related purposes
- Citation: Online Safety Amendment (Digital Duty of Care) Bill 2026
- Territorial extent: Australia
- Passed by: House of Representatives
- Considered by: Senate

Legislative history

Initiating chamber: House of Representatives
- Introduced by: Anika Wells, Minister for Communications
- Committee responsible: Senate Environment and Communications Legislation
- First reading: 15 October 2026
- Second reading: 15–28 October 2026
- Voting summary: 96 voted for; 37 voted against; 17 absent
- Third reading: 28 October 2026
- Voting summary: 96 voted for; 38 voted against; 16 absent
- Passed: 28 October 2026

Amends
- Online Safety Act 2021

Related legislation
- Online Safety Amendment (Social Media Minimum Age) Act 2024
- Status: Pending — before Senate

The Online Safety Amendment (Digital Duty of Care) Bill 2026 provides the basis for a digital duty of care in Australia. The proposal requires that social media companies allow users to opt-out of algorithms. The proposed legislation would require that companies conduct regular and thorough risk assessments, these assessments may become available to the eSafety Commissioner within 30 days if that is requested. The legislation would require that users are protected from seriously harmful content and conduct; including illegal content, child sexual exploitation, grooming, promotion or incitement of sexual violence, support for terrorism, encouraging criminal offences illicit drug use, and abhorrent violent conduct

== Background ==
A digital duty of care was recommended to the federal government by a review in 2024 of the Online Safety Act 2021 but the proposal did not proceed as the government was focused at that time on implementing social media age restrictions through the Online Safety Amendment (Social Media Minimum Age) Act 2024.

On 1 September 2026, sexual consent advocate Chanel Contos made a speech at the National Press Club where she spoke against algorithms and recommended an opt-in system with social media feeds being limited to accounts that the user follows and content being presented in a chronological order. Conversely, National Party leader Matt Canavan said that social media did have toxic elements but criticised the "feminisation of our curriculum". Treasurer Jim Chalmers has also criticised social media algorithms for providing "rubbish" to kids.

== Effects ==
On 8 September 2026, the government announced a digital duty of care package that would require social media companies to allow users to opt-out of recommendation algorithms. Social media companies will be required to make their apps show a push notification asking users whether or not they want to receive recommended content. Social media companies may be hit with a fine of up to $109.2 million for non-compliance with the new laws. The federal government embarked on a process of consultation with advocates.

The Online Safety Amendment (Digital Duty of Care) Bill 2026 would require that users are protected from seriously harmful content and conduct; including illegal content, content related to child sexual exploitation, child sexual abuse, grooming, promotion or incitement of sexual violence, support for terrorism, encouraging criminal offences, illicit drug use, and abhorrent violent conduct. The government wants to pass the legislation before the end of the year, while commencement of the legislation will take place a year later. The Senate Environment and Communications Legislation Committee will create a report on the legislation by 20 November 2026.

== Reception ==
Google have claimed that a section of the Online Safety Amendment (Digital Duty of Care) Bill 2026 would mandate age checks and block under-18s from "everyday communication services like messaging, email and private file storage", the section of the legislation in question is for banning children's access to pornography.

Liberal senator Sarah Henderson said the bill was "deeply flawed" as it would require companies providing email services to "conduct mass surveillance of people's emails". The Coalition has claimed that the bill amounts to censorship and aims to block criticism of the government, Communications Minister Anika Wells denies this. Greens senator Sarah Hanson-Young is in support of greater protections for people on social media and said that TikTok's guidelines "clearly aren't cutting it". Hanson-Young said "sick and tired of being manipulated, dictated and addicted by big tech" and added that the Greens would support the bill's passage through Parliament if the legislation enabled people to directly sue tech companies.

== International criticism ==
The United States government formally criticised the proposed Digital Duty of Care during public consultation on the exposure draft of the Online Safety Amendment (Digital Duty of Care) Bill 2026.

In a statement released by the U.S. Embassy in Canberra on 22 September 2026, the United States expressed "serious concerns" about the Australian Government's stated goal of mandating broad duty-of-care requirements that dictate how platforms manage content and users' feeds. The statement identified two main risks: the way the Australian Government or the Minister for Communications would designate what constitutes "foreseeable harm," and the likelihood that platforms would alter their algorithmic systems to suppress expression that should be protected in order to avoid liability, or would default to pre-emptive censorship.

The United States was particularly concerned about potential mandates that would allow regulators to impose rigid, one-size-fits-all platform design requirements, such as forced chronological feeds or opt-in recommendation systems. It warned that a framework empowering governments to enforce vague definitions of "harm" risked becoming a mechanism for viewpoint-based censorship, as platforms would be incentivised to over-moderate protected speech. Such measures could also reduce the reach of independent journalists or other voices whose content addresses sensitive or controversial topics.

The statement further highlighted the extraterritorial effects of the proposed regime. Most of the social media and video-sharing platforms that would be affected are U.S.-headquartered companies operating substantially on U.S. soil and serving American users alongside Australian ones. Mandated design features, especially those applied to algorithms, could affect what users see, say and hear not only in Australia but globally, because platforms generally build and deploy product features at a global scale rather than market-by-market. The United States reiterated its opposition to foreign measures that result in extraterritorial censorship of protected speech by Americans online.

Economic concerns were also raised, including potential impacts on fair competition, market access and trade treatment for American companies, independent media and content creators, as well as the risk of disproportionate compliance burdens.
