= Lego Life =

Defunct social media app created by the Lego Group

- Original author: The Lego Group
- Release: January 31, 2017; 9 years ago – August 2024; 2 years ago
- Operating system: iOS, Android
- Type: Social media
- Website: www.lego.com/en-gb/life

Lego Life was a social media platform created and owned by the Lego Group. Intended as a safe platform for younger users, it was released on January 31, 2017 and retired in 2024.

Themed after the Lego brand, the app contained various features allowing users to share Lego creations and interact with the community.

== History ==
The Lego Life app entered early access in the United Kingdom in 2016, before being officially released on January 31, 2017, with the plan to incorporate more features in the coming months. Inspiration for the app and its process allowing people to post creations came from the Lego Group seeing children publicly share their builds to the Lego magazine and website.

The app's senior director Robert Lowe later discussed the challenges of continuing to update and market it after the initial release, which he admitted may have been somewhat too quick. The development team considered integrating the features into other Lego apps, but ultimately chose a single centralized app. When describing the app, he stated they were "trying to build something that is a social network but [...] not built exactly like any existing social network." In January 2018, it was reported that the Lego Group was considering developing a Chinese version of the app with Tencent, with whom they announced a partnership the same month.

By the end of 2017, the app was available in nearly thirty countries and had received over three million downloads. It reached nearly eighty countries by 2021, when the app had over nine million users. Over nine million posts were uploaded to the app alone in 2019. Further, the app received nearly six million downloads in 2020, over seven million in 2021, and over seven million more in 2022. By the end of 2021, the app had received over thirty-three million downloads in total since it was launched.

== Features ==
The development of the app was heavily focused on adapting it and its features to be appropriate and accessible for younger audiences. At launch, Lego Life was described as being similar to platforms such as Instagram or Pinterest, with users able to sign up through their Lego ID and join the app under an anonymous, auto-generated username. Uploaded content, including images, was required to go through a moderation system, with posts also required to be Lego-related in some form. To aid with this, the app featured Captain Safety, a character who guided users on online safety

At launch, the Lego Life app had a unique keyboard allowing users to communicate with special emojis

Posts could also be liked and commented on. At the time, however, only emojis were allowed to be used in comments on posts, limiting communication between users, although text comments were still allowed on official posts by the Lego Group. During development, the Lego Group conducted research on how children express emotion through the use of different emojis, which they described as a "wordless language".

Instead of profile pictures, users could design custom minifigures as their avatars, and could also join groups based around different Lego themes or subjects. The app featured profiles from characters from Lego media, who would sometimes comment on user posts. Users could participate in different building challenges and quizzes featured in the app and post their entries, as well as watch videos. The developers described the app at the time as a "continuous work in progress, as adaptable as its young user base."

Initially, parental consent for children using the app was done through email. However, the parental verification process was updated in June 2020: afterwards, more detailed proof such as credit card details were required in order for users to be able to access all of Lego Life's features.

== Discontinuation ==
On July 1, 2024, the Lego Group launched Lego Play, a different app that contains some features similar to Lego Life, including the shared ability for users to post their own creations, but focuses more on other components such as the inclusion of minigames. The Lego Group subsequently announced that Lego Life would be retired the next month, with Lego Play as its replacement.

According to the Lego Group, the Lego Play app was developed for a younger generation more focused on gaming, while Lego Life had been developed for Generation Z, a generation more focused on social media. Lego Life was subsequently retired in August 2024 and is no longer available for download.

== Reception ==
Common Sense Media gave Lego Life a 3/5 star rating, praising the app's safety features but also criticizing the commercial nature of it, which they felt left "little room to build community". They also pointed out that the app may only appeal to users who were already fans of Lego.

=== Awards and nominations ===
| Year | Award | Category | Result | Ref. |
|---|---|---|---|---|
| 2018 | Webby Awards | Mobile Sites & Apps: Kids & Family | Won | |
| 2018 | Webby Awards | Mobile Sites & Apps: Kids & Family | Won (People's Voice Winner) | |
