= Evelyn Marsden =

Australian Titanic survivor (1883–1938)

- Born: 15 October 1883; Stockyard Creek, Colony of South Australia, British Empire
- Died: 30 August 1938 (aged 54); Sydney, Australia
- Occupations: Stewardess, nurse
- Spouse: William Abel James

Evelyn Marsden (later married as Evelyn James) (15 October 1883 – 30 August 1938) was the only Australian woman to survive the sinking of RMS Titanic. She left the ship in lifeboat 16.

Marsden was the daughter of railway worker Walter Henry Marsden (Hoyleton Stationmaster in 1912) and Annie Bradshaw. Her birthplace of Stockyard Creek is about 80 km north of Adelaide, South Australia, and is now ruins.

== Titanic survivor ==
Evelyn, who previously worked on board the ship RMS Olympic, signed-on to RMS Titanic on 6 April 1912, and gave her address as 7 West Marlands Terrace, The Polygon, Southampton. She was 28 and single at the time and as a stewardess she was paid monthly wages of £3 10s. As a trained and qualified nurse, she assisted the Chief Surgeon and the Assistant Surgeon when required.

There is mention of Evelyn in a letter by Mary Sloan to her sister on 27 April 1912, stating that they both were taken to Dr. Simpson's room for a little whiskey and water during the disaster. Dr. Simpson then hurried away and was never seen by them again. Evelyn and Mary escaped on Boat 16 which was lowered at 1.35 a.m. from the Port side by 6th Officer Moody. This boat held about 40 people with no incidents recorded while loading. They were in this boat all night until RMS Carpathia picked them up, at about seven in the morning. George Robinson, the uncle of Evelyn Marsden was also noted as being aboard the Titanic.

== Youth ==
As a youth, she learned to row a boat against the tides and currents of the Murray River while visiting a farm at Murray Bridge, South Australia. Evelyn worked as a Probationer Nurse at the Royal Adelaide Hospital (then known as the Adelaide Hospital) between 15 January and 11 November 1907. Her salary was twelve pounds per annum and she was given apartment rations, fuel, light, and a uniform. From 8 May 1907 to 5 June 1907, Evelyn went on sick leave with full pay for about a month due to contracting gangrene of the finger whilst on duty. After the Titanic disaster she returned to that farm to thank the family for teaching her to row and handle a boat properly.

== Later years ==
Following the Titanic tragedy she married Dr William Abel James, who had also worked for White Star Line. He studied as a medical student whilst living in two rooms at 22 Glenroy Street, Roath, Glamorgan, Wales, according to the 1901 census. On her return to Australia she was heralded as a heroine, calling first at the Semaphore, South Australia, anchorage on 2 November 1912, on board the White Star steamer Irishman, on which her husband also served as ship's doctor, and so was subsequently bound to continue on to its final destination of Sydney, arriving 14 November, before disembarking the next day following a day's quarantine. Her husband took up residence as a doctor in South Australia and they moved into a new apartment in Ruthven Mansions on Pulteney Street. Later they moved to Wallaroo, South Australia, living and working there for 15 months before finally moving to Bondi, Sydney, where her husband continued work as a doctor. Evelyn died on 30 August 1938, with her husband dying soon after and they were both buried at Waverley Cemetery, Sydney. They had no children.

Their grave was unmarked until 5 October 2000, when a headstone was finally erected on their gravesite.

Australian journalist Lisa Wilkinson published her story of Marsden, The Titanic Story of Evelyn, in 2026.
