= Peter FitzSimons =

Australian author, commentator, radio and television presenter

Peter FitzSimons AM
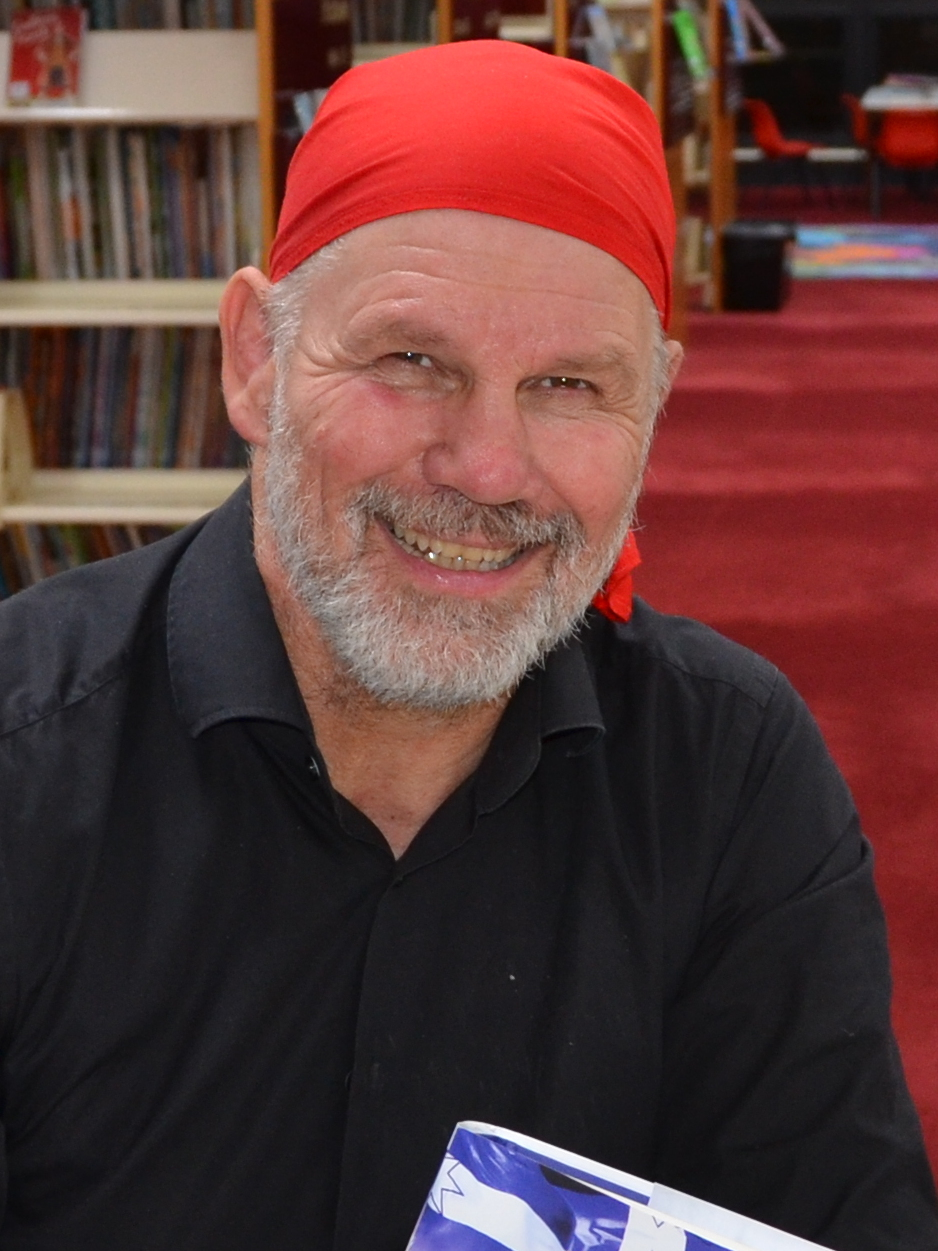
- FitzSimons in 2013
- Born: Peter John FitzSimons; 29 June 1961 (age 65); Sydney, Australia
- Education: Knox Grammar School; Findlay High School; University of Sydney
- Occupations: Journalist; writer; radio and television personality; former rugby union football player
- Spouse: Lisa Wilkinson (m. 1992)
- Writing career
- Years active: 1987–present
- Genre: Non-fiction

Rugby union career
- Position: Lock
Amateur team(s)
Years	Team	Apps	(Points)
–	Sydney University Football Club		
–	Manly RUFC		
1985–1989	CA Brive		
International career
Years	Team	Apps	(Points)
1989–1990	Australia	7	

Peter John FitzSimons (born 29 June 1961) is an Australian author, journalist, and radio and television presenter. He is a former national representative rugby union player and was the chair of the Australian Republic Movement from 2015 to 2022.

== Early life ==
FitzSimons grew up in Peats Ridge, in the Central Coast of New South Wales. He was one of seven children. He attended Peats Ridge Public School and Knox Grammar School before going in 1978 to Findlay High School, Ohio, for a year as an exchange student on an American Field Service Scholarship. He then completed an arts degree at the University of Sydney, residing at Wesley College from 1980 to 1982.

== Career ==
=== Rugby ===
FitzSimons first played club rugby with the Sydney University Football Club and then with the Manly RUFC in Sydney in the 1980s under the coaching of Alan Jones. Between 1985 and 1989, he played with CA Brive in France for four seasons as the club's first foreign player. He played seven test matches at lock for the Australian national rugby union team between 1989 and 1990, debuting against France in Strasbourg in November 1989, on the Wallabies 1989 tour of Europe. His final Test match was against the All Blacks in Christchurch.

In On a Wing and a Prayer, former Wallabies winger David Campese criticised FitzSimons for starting a brawl in Australia's first Test against France in 1990. Campese labelled FitzSimons' actions "a disgrace to the good name of rugby" and asserted that "he was doing the game and its reputation enormous damage." Campese cautioned that if such fights "turn even one family away from the game, then they have been too costly".

Former Wallabies backrower Willie Ofahengaue said of FitzSimons: "He's a big character. Funny guy. Talkative. One thing I remember about rooming with him was he used to get his suitcase, tip it up and pour everything out on to the floor. When it was time to go home he would chuck everything back in any old way. Fitzy was a real roughie, but he is married now so he must have changed."

=== Journalist ===
FitzSimons has written for The Sydney Morning Herald since 1988, and has been a sports columnist for that publication since 1987. He regularly appears on the Australian Foxtel program The Back Page, formerly hosted by rugby league journalist Mike Gibson and now Tony Squires. For the Saturday edition of The Sydney Morning Herald, FitzSimons writes a column titled "The Fitz Files" which looks at all the happenings over the past seven days in sport. He writes a more general version of "The Fitz Files" in The Sun-Herald on Sundays, focusing on community activities and events in Sydney. Andrew Denton has called him "Australia's finest sports journalist". On 25 September 2001, he wrote a thought-provoking opinion editorial piece titled "Memo world: try saying sorry to avoid a sorry end".

In August 2022, FitzSimons threatened to sue Senator Jacinta Nampijinpa Price for defamation when she said that he had been rude and aggressive in a telephone interview. Price urged FitzSimons and The Sydney Morning Herald to release the recording of the interview but they declined to do so.

=== Radio ===
In January 2006, FitzSimons began co-hosting a breakfast radio program with Mike Carlton on Sydney radio station 2UE. He was brought onto the 2UE breakfast show in an attempt to boost the program's dwindling ratings. However, the Mike and Fitz Breakfast Show still trailed a long way behind the number one program on 2GB, hosted by FitzSimons' former coach Alan Jones. After two years, FitzSimons quit to become a stay-at-home dad and focus on his writing.

=== Author ===
FitzSimons is a prolific writer and is one of Australia's best-selling non-fiction writers. He has written books about subjects such as Nancy Wake, the shipwreck of the Batavia, Sir John Monash, Breaker Morant, Charles Kingsford Smith and John Eales.

==== Selected books ====
- FitzSimons, Peter (2011). Nancy Wake: A Biography of Our Greatest War Heroine 1912–2011. Sydney: HarperCollins Publishers. ISBN 978-0-7322-9525-7. OCLC 793815852.
- FitzSimons, Peter (2011). Batavia: Betrayal. Shipwreck. Murder. Sexual Slavery. Courage. A Spine-Chilling Chapter in Australian History. Sydney: William Heinemann. ISBN 978-1-86471-040-3. OCLC 774921323.
- FitzSimons, Peter (2017). Victory at Villers-Bretonneux: Why a French Town Will Never Forget the Anzacs. North Sydney, NSW. ISBN 978-1-925324-67-9. OCLC 993680220.
- FitzSimons, Peter (2018). Mutiny on the Bounty: A Saga of Sex, Sedition, Mayhem and Mutiny, and Survival Against Extraordinary Odds. Sydney, NSW. ISBN 978-0-7336-3411-6. OCLC 1030754409.
- FitzSimons, Peter (2018). Burke & Wills: The Triumph and Tragedy of Australia's Most Famous Explorers. Sydney, NSW. ISBN 978-0-7336-4079-7. OCLC 1030754077.
- FitzSimons, Peter (2020). Breaker Morant: The Epic Story of the Boer War and Harry 'Breaker' Morant, Drover, Horseman, Bush Poet, Murderer or Hero?. Sydney, NSW. ISBN 978-0-7336-4130-5. OCLC 1159022386.
- FitzSimons, Peter (2022). The Sydney Opera House. Australia: Hachette Australia. ISBN 9780733641336. OCLC 1273171989.
- FitzSimons, Peter (2022). The Battle of Long Tan. Sydney. ISBN 978-0-7336-4661-4. OCLC 1330547746.

== Community and political activism ==
FitzSimons is or was involved with a range of community organisations. At the University of Sydney he was a fellow of the Senate from 2009 to 2013, as well as Pro-Chancellor, a patron of The Russell Prize for Humour Writing, State Library of New South Wales, since 2015 and chairman of the Australian Republic Movement from 2015 to 2022. Additionally, he served on the council of the Australian War Memorial and founded the Cauliflower Club with Nick Farr-Jones.

In the lead-up to 2019 New South Wales state election, FitzSimons began a campaign to prevent the demolition of the Sydney Football Stadium and Stadium Australia. He began by launching a petition in late 2017 on Change.org that reached approximately 220,000 signatures prior to the election as well as numerous editorial articles decrying the demolitions. The stadium issue became a major element of the campaign with Labor leader Michael Daley calling the election a "referendum on stadiums". On 5 December 2017, FitzSimons remarked on Twitter that the incumbent Gladys Berejiklian government could "bulldoze and rebuild three new stadiums, including Parra, for $3 billion—on no demand—or they can win the next election, but they can't do both."

On 23 March, Berejiklian and her coalition were easily returned to government, with political commentators suggesting that the issue did not resonate with the wider community of the state. The campaign had a minor success, however, as the government changed the original plan for a complete knock down rebuild of Stadium Australia, and instead would go ahead with a billion-dollar refurbishment. The refurbishment would also be cancelled, although no funds were allocated to any grassroots sports facilities as FitzSimons wished, and later had a similar level of funding directed to a new stadium in Penrith.

== Personal life ==
FitzSimons is married to Australian journalist and TV presenter Lisa Wilkinson. They have three children and live in Sydney. One of his daughters, Billi FitzSimons is editor of youth news media outlet The Daily Aus.

FitzSimons has identified himself as an atheist.

FitzSimons is known for wearing a red bandana. He has explained his regularly wearing of the bandana due to his children giving it to him to wear, so he wears it for them. He is at times referred to informally as "Pirate Pete" due to his wearing of the headwear.

== Honours ==
On 13 June 2011, FitzSimons was named a Member of the Order of Australia for service to literature as a biographer, sports journalist and commentator, and to the community through contributions to conservation, disability care, social welfare and sporting organisations.
