= Tween Summit =

Annual event on child Internet safety

The Tween Summit is a yearly event hosted by the NCMEC, Cox Communications, and John Walsh where young people aged 8–14 and their parents gather in Washington DC to discuss internet safety.

== Topics at the 3rd Annual event in 2008 ==
John Walsh and Lauren Nelson, Miss America 2007 hosted the discussion which covered research on the behavior of young people, primarily those between the ages of eight and twelve.

=== Results of Survey ===
- 73% of tweens report that their parents have talked to them "a lot" about internet safety
- 96% tell their parents at least some of what they do online

- 79% tell their parents everything

- 91% of those who tell someone when they receive online messages from strangers reach out to mom and dad
- 91% are online by age 9
- 27% admit to lying about their age online
- One in ten have responded to and chatted online with people they do not know
- One in five have posted personal info about themselves on the internet
- The number of kids online nearly even triples from ages eight to ten and eleven to fourteen

== See also ==
- ThinkUKnow
