= Lisa Wilkinson =

Australian television presenter (born 1959)

Lisa Wilkinson AM
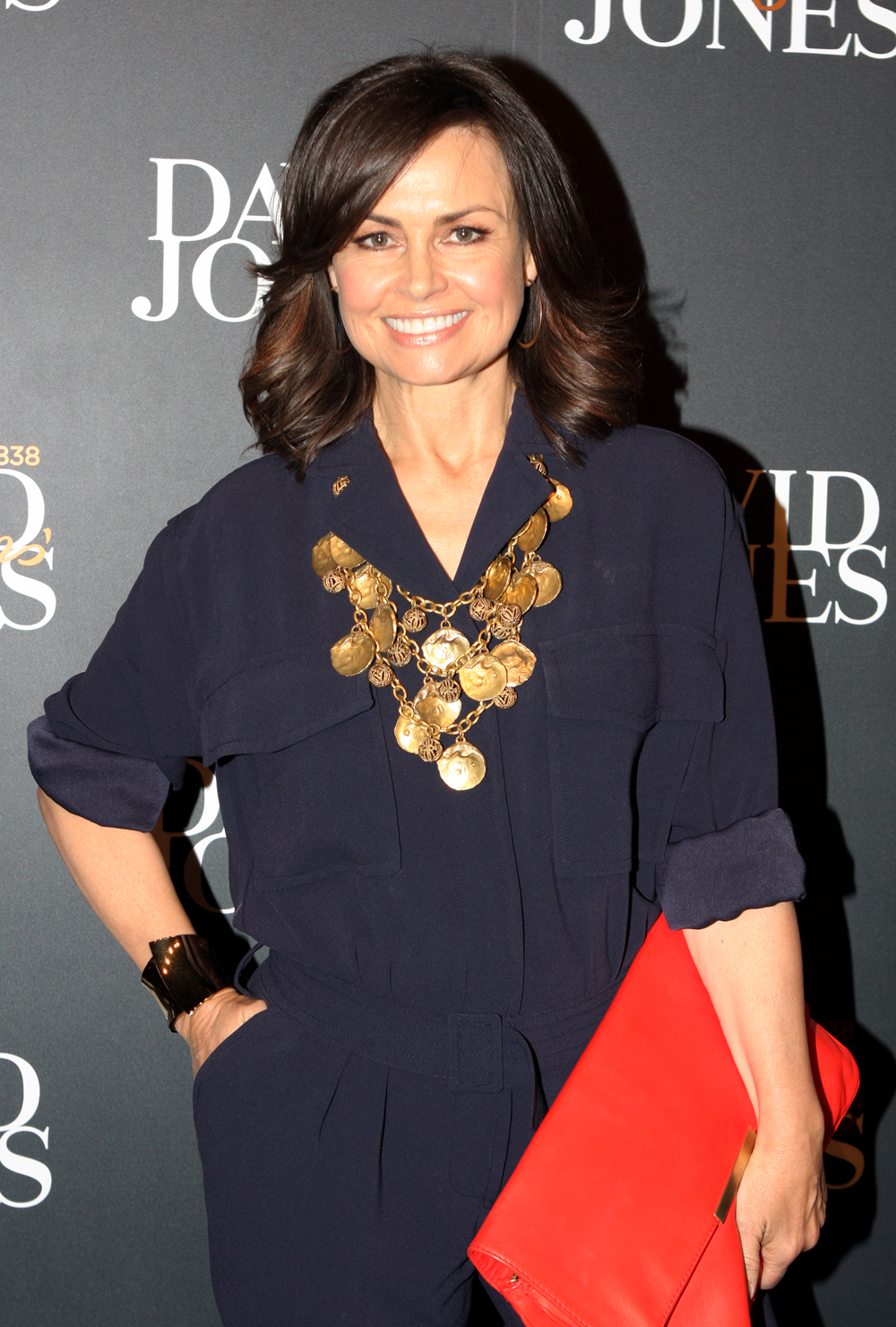
- Wilkinson in 2013
- Born: 19 December 1959 (age 66); Wollongong, New South Wales, Australia
- Education: Campbelltown Performing Arts High School
- Occupations: Journalist; television presenter; magazine editor
- Years active: 1980–present
- Television: Today; Weekend Sunrise; The Project; Ambulance Australia
- Spouse: Peter FitzSimons (m. 1992)
- Children: 3
- Website: www.lisawilkinson.com.au

Lisa Clare Wilkinson (born 19 December 1959) is an Australian television presenter, journalist, author and magazine editor.

Wilkinson has previously co-hosted the Nine Network's breakfast television program, Today, with Karl Stefanovic (2007–2017), Weekend Sunrise on the Seven Network (2005–2007), and The Project on Network Ten (2018–2022).

== Early and personal life ==
Wilkinson was born in Wollongong, but grew up in Campbelltown, in Sydney's Western Suburbs and attended Campbelltown High School (now Campbelltown Performing Arts High School).

She married author, journalist and former rugby international Peter FitzSimons on 26 September 1992; they have two sons and one daughter. One of her daughters, Billi FitzSimons is the editor of youth news media outlet The Daily Aus.

== Career ==
=== Magazines ===
Wilkinson began her career working for the magazine Dolly. At age 21, she was offered the job as its editor. During her time there she became known for discovering young female talent, including Nicole Kidman.

After tripling the circulation at Dolly, she was approached by Kerry Packer to become editor of Australian Consolidated Press women's lifestyle magazine, Cleo. One of her first acts was to remove the magazine's infamous male centrefold. During her time as editor, she mentored up and coming journalists such as Mia Freedman and Deborah Thomas. Over ten years Wilkinson became the title's longest-serving editor, and during her tenure there was unprecedented circulation growth for the magazine. Wilkinson went on to become Cleo's International Editor-in-Chief as it opened titles in New Zealand and Asia.

From 1999 to 2007, Wilkinson was editor-at-large of the Australian Women's Weekly. In August 2015, she was asked by Arianna Huffington to become the Australian Editor-at-large of the Huffington Post, a role she held until 2018.

=== Television ===
Wilkinson's television career began in the late 1990s when she became a regular panelist on Network Ten and Foxtel's Beauty and the Beast. During the 2000 Summer Olympics, she (along with Duncan Armstrong) co-hosted The Morning Shift on the Seven Network.

In April 2005, Wilkinson began hosting Weekend Sunrise on the Seven Network with Chris Reason, and later with Andrew O'Keefe. On 10 May 2007, it was confirmed that Wilkinson was to co-host Today on the Nine Network after Jessica Rowe left the network and she began appearing on Today on 28 May 2007. This was Stefanovic's fifth female co-host in just over two years. In 2016, the duo took the show to number one in the breakfast TV wars for the first time in 12 years.

From 2008 to 2016, Wilkinson was the co-host of the Nine Network's Carols by Candlelight, replacing long time host Ray Martin when Martin semi-retired. Wilkinson's co-host from 2008 until 2012 was Karl Stefanovic, and in 2013 she was joined by David Campbell. In 2013, Wilkinson gave the Andrew Olle Media Lecture on the treatment of women in and by the media. She was the first female journalist to give the speech since Jana Wendt in 1997. In 2017 she left the Nine Network, and was replaced by Sonia Kruger.

In 2017, Wilkinson was remarked on by the Daily Mail for wearing on air a blouse she had worn four months before. Her cohost, Karl Stefanovic, had previously worn the same suit every day for a year without attracting notice. Wilkinson posted a tweet criticizing the sexism and wore the blouse on air the next day, sardonically writing "my greatest legacy to the annals of female news broadcasting history will likely be that I dared to wear the same outfit two days in a row on national TV". Other male and female Today Show hosts also wore the blouse on air in following days.

On 16 October 2017, Wilkinson resigned from the Nine Network and Today effective immediately due to a contract dispute with management over the significant gender pay gap that existed between her and long-time co-host Karl Stefanovic after ten years with the network. Wilkinson herself announced she was leaving on Twitter and then just over an hour later announced on Twitter that she was joining Network 10. In her 2021 memoir, It Wasn't Meant to Be Like This, Wilkinson revealed that she had been fired over her request for a fairer pay structure at the Network.

In 2018, she joined The Project, a nightly TV current affairs programme on Network 10. On 20 November 2022, Wilkinson stepped down from the role.

=== Other work ===
Wilkinson published her autobiography in 2021: It Wasn't Meant to Be Like This.

In 2026, she published her story of Evelyn Marsden, the only Australian survivor of the sinking of RMS Titanic: The Titanic Story of Evelyn. It is set to be adapted into a TV series.

=== Coverage of the Parliament House sexual misconduct allegations ===
In February 2021, Wilkinson interviewed political staffer Brittany Higgins on The Project about being allegedly raped in 2019 in an office at the Australian Parliament House, though no rapist was named. In October 2021, Wilkinson was for the second time named a finalist in the Walkley Awards for the interview. The story led to a full cultural review by Federal Sex Discrimination Commissioner, Kate Jenkins, into the workplace treatment of women in Parliament House.

On receiving an award at the Logie Awards in June 2022, Wilkinson delivered a speech in which she "openly referred to and praised" Higgins, despite having been warned of the associated risks of doing so while criminal court proceedings were underway. Subsequent publicity generated from Wilkinson's speech caused the lawyers representing the accused man, Bruce Lehrmann, to lodge an application to temporarily stay proceedings. The lawyers argued that the "speech did not need to be made", and the ACT Chief Justice Lucy McCallum granted the application.

Commenting on Wilkinson's speech, Chief Justice McCallum said, "What concerns me most about this recent round is that the distinction between an allegation and a finding of guilt has been completely obliterated". Her Honour further stated that, "The implicit premise of [Wilkinson's speech was] to celebrate the truthfulness of the story she exposed" before any finding of guilt, and in the context of the accused denying that "any sexual activity took place". The Australian Broadcasting Corporation reported that "the prosecution is considering making an application for a restraint on commentary by Ms Wilkinson".

As a subsequent independent inquiry investigating the prosecution of Lehrmann, ACT Prosecutor Shane Drumgold admitted he "misread the situation" in a meeting with Wilkinson discussing her acceptance speech for a Logie award and that he subsequently misled the judge about Wilkinson's speech.

In 2023, Lehrmann launched a defamation suit against Wilkinson, Samantha Maiden, Network 10, and News Corp, and subsequently the ABC. In May 2023, Lehrmann dropped his defamation case against News Corp and Samantha Maiden, but not Wilkinson, the Ten Network or the ABC. Wilkinson subsequently commenced legal action against her employer, Network 10, over alleged failure of the Network to pay her legal fees of $700,000. In April 2024, the defamation suit was dismissed when the court ruled that on the balance of probabilities Lehrmann raped Higgins.

== Honours ==
Wilkinson was appointed a Member of the Order of Australia in the 2016 Australia Day Honours list for significant service to the print and broadcast media as a journalist and presenter, and to a range of youth and women's health groups.

In 2017, Wilkinson's portrait by artist Peter Smeeth was a finalist in the Archibald Prize, and winner of the Packing Room Prize. In 2019, Wilkinson was awarded an Honorary Doctor of Letters by Wollongong University for her "significant impact on journalism, media and business in Australia and internationally, and for the contribution her outstanding leadership and advocacy has made to Australian society".

In 2022, Wilkinson was part of The Project team that won two Logie Awards – one for Most Popular Panel or Current Affairs Program and one for Most Outstanding News Coverage or Public Affairs Report.
