= Deleting Online Predators Act of 2006 =

The Deleting Online Predators Act of 2006 (DOPA) is a bill (H.R. 5319) brought before the United States House of Representatives on May 9, 2006 by Republican Pennsylvania Representative (R-PA) Mike Fitzpatrick. The bill, if enacted, would have amended the Communications Act of 1934, requiring schools and libraries that receive E-rate funding to protect minors from online predators in the absence of parental supervision when using "Commercial Social Networking Websites" and "Chat Rooms". The bill would prohibit schools and libraries from providing access to these types of websites to minors or create restrictions to use of these types of sites. The bill also would require the institutions to be capable of disabling the restrictions for "use by an adult or by minors with adult supervision to enable access for educational purposes."

After passing the House, it was sent to the Senate and referred to committee in July 2006. It was reintroduced in the 110th Congress, but did not advance.

The bill is considered controversial because according to its critics the bill could limit access to a wide range of websites, including many with harmless and educational material. Arguments for the bill focus on the fear of adults contacting children on MySpace and similar websites. Many Internet websites, however (ranging from Yahoo to Slashdot to Amazon.com), allow user accounts, public profiles, and user forums, in accord with the bill's definition of "social networking". The bill places the onus upon the Federal Communications Commission to provide clarification.

== History of the Deleting Online Predators Act ==
The bill was introduced on May 9, 2006 by Rep. Michael Fitzpatrick (R-PA) as part of the Suburban Caucus agenda. Along with co-sponsors, he spoke in favor of it. The Caucus's "Suburban Agenda" was shaped around the results of a January 2007 survey conducted by John McLaughlin. McLaughlin focused on issues that could weaken the expected impact of midterm elections on the Republican hold of Congress in Suburban constituencies like Bucks County, Pennsylvania and Orange County, California.

On July 26, 2006, DOPA was brought up for debate and an immediate vote in the House. It was criticized by Rep. Edward Markey (D-MA) and Rep. Bart Stupak (D-MI) for being hastily rewritten before its vote and did not get markup of a full House Committee. The House of Representatives voted 410-15 (7 Not Voting), on a Roll Call vote, to pass the bill as amended. The following day, the bill was received in the U.S. Senate and referred to the Commerce, Science, and Transportation Committee. The bill was not voted on by the Senate.

On January 4, 2007, Senator Ted Stevens (R-AK) reintroduced DOPA in the U.S. Senate as part of S.49, "Protecting Children in the 21st Century Act". The bill was immediately referred to the Commerce, Science, and Transportation Committee. On February 16, 2007, Rep. Mark Kirk (R-IL) reintroduced The Deleting Online Predators Act of 2007. The bill was referred to the House Committee on Energy and Commerce.

Congress	Short title	Bill number(s)	Date introduced	Sponsor(s)	# of cosponsors	Latest status
109th Congress	Deleting Online Predators Act of 2006	H.R. 5319	May 9, 2006	Mike Fitzpatrick (R-PA)	39	Passed the House (410-15)
110th Congress	Protecting Children in the 21st Century Act	S. 49	January 4, 2007	Ted Stevens (R-AK)	0	Died in committee
110th Congress	Deleting Online Predators Act of 2007	H.R. 1120	February 16, 2007	Mark Kirk (R-IL)	95	Died in committee

=== State Legislation Restricting Access to Social Networking Sites ===
Similar bills to ban or restrict access to social networking sites have been introduced in Georgia, North Carolina, Oklahoma and Illinois in 2007.

The untitled Georgia bill and the North Carolina Protect Children From Sexual Predators Act impose criminal penalties on any owner or operator of a social networking website that permits a minor to create a profile or join the site without parental consent; if the parent consents, the site must allow parents full access to the minor's profile and webpage. Oklahoma's HB 1715 would require public libraries to block access to email and social networking sites or deny minors access to the Internet in its entirety.

The Illinois Social Networking Prohibition Act would require all public libraries and schools to block access to any social networking site for users of all ages.

== Specifics of the proposed Act ==
=== Definitions ===
"Commercial Social Networking Websites" were originally defined within the bill as:

Sec.2(c)(J) a commercially operated Internet website that-

(i) allows users to create web pages or profiles that provide information about themselves and are available to other users; and
(ii) offers a mechanism for communication with other users, such as a forum, chat room, email, or instant messenger.

The term "chat rooms" were defined as:

Sec.2(c)(K) Internet websites through which a number of users can communicate in real time via text and that allow messages to be almost immediately visible to all other users or to a designated segment of all other users.

Popular websites fitting this definition include MySpace, Facebook, Friendster, and LiveJournal. This definition could, however, potentially cover a much broader range of websites. Many news websites such as Slashdot and blogs like RedState permit both public profiles and personal journals. Amazon.com allows personal profiles including photos, interests, and contact information. In addition, many media companies, such as News.com publisher CNET Networks, permit users to create profiles displaying photos and other personal information, as well as sending email to other members. Some popular chat services include ICQ, AOL Instant Messenger, and Yahoo! Chat.

Before the floor vote in the House, the bill was amended to read:

(J) COMMERCIAL SOCIAL NETWORKING WEBSITES; CHAT ROOMS—Within 120 days after the date of enactment of the Deleting Online Predators Act of 2006, the Commission shall by rule define the terms 'social networking website' and 'chat room' for purposes of this subsection. In determining the definition of a social networking website, the Commission shall take into consideration the extent to which a website—

(i) is offered by a commercial entity;
(ii) permits registered users to create an on-line profile that includes detailed personal information;
(iii) permits registered users to create an on-line journal and share such a journal with other users;
(iv) elicits highly-personalized information from users; and
(v) enables communication among users.

Under the new language, the Federal Communications Commission, not Congress, will define these terms, using the five criteria as guidelines. Whether the new definition would ultimately be broader or narrower than the original one is unclear. Commercial operation, however, no longer appears to be an absolute requirement, and it could potentially encompass other websites. Like all other provisions of the bill, it is subject to change in a conference committee before it becomes law.

=== FTC Requirements ===
The bill would also require the Federal Trade Commission to issue a consumer alert about the online predation dangers of commercial social networking websites and chat rooms and to create a website for parents, teachers, school administrators, and others about the dangers of these types of websites, including a list of such websites.

== Controversy ==
Both sides spoke out in favor of blocking online predators. The controversy was over the effectiveness and drawbacks of the specific measures to be taken.

=== Arguments in Favor ===
The bill's proponents, including members of the Suburban Caucus, argue that restrictions on access to social networking websites are necessary to protect children from online predators, whether the predators be sexually oriented offenders or even simple online bullies. In introducing his part of the Suburban Caucus agenda, Rep. Michael Fitzpatrick (R-PA) said that as a father he was concerned that, since the "world moves and changes at a dizzying pace," he felt he could no longer keep up in protecting his children, especially when they had Internet access in places other than their own home. He believed legislation was therefore necessary. In his speech, he noted that one in five children had received an unwanted online solicitation of a sexual nature and that child pornography had increased by 2,000 percent in the past decade. The former is most likely a reference to the Youth Internet Safety Survey from University of New Hampshire, while the latter is a reference to the increase in arrests from the FBI's "Innocent Images National Initiative".

Rep. Judy Biggert (R-IL) added that children have often been taught never to talk to strangers, and that the Internet makes the temptation to talk to strangers stronger. In fact, she noted, a minor in Michigan had traveled halfway across the world to Jericho to meet in person someone she met on MySpace.

Rep. Ginny Brown-Waite (R-FL) spoke and referred to the murder of Jessica Lunsford by John Couey, and said that stalking could now occur online as well as in person.

There are many online safety concerns for children using MySpace, including the amount of specific personal information to use certain website tools, lack of validation for other members' information, and lack of sufficient moderation by the website for review of user violations.

=== Arguments in Opposition ===
The arguments against the bill have focused on efforts to revise it to directly address the problem of online predators, and to prevent the blocking of harmless and/or educational websites. Rep. Bart Stupak (D-MI) summarized: "Unfortunately, child predators are not the target of today's bill. This bill will not delete online predators. Rather, it will delete legitimate Web content from schools and libraries."

==== Overly Broad Definition ====
As noted in the Definition section, many websites allow public user profiles and provide forums. Examples include Yahoo, Amazon.com, Slashdot, RedState, CNET Networks, and thousands of others. This potentially qualifies them as social networking websites regardless of the content within the websites.

==== Educational Use ====
Most school libraries already have filters on incoming Internet access due to the Children's Internet Protection Act (CIPA). Opponents of the bill point out that the language of the bill would extend such filtering to include websites based on specific technologies rather than specific content, including websites based on those technologies that are used for educational purposes. Some educators have incorporated blogs and Wikis into classroom lessons for students due to their usefulness as a critiquing and editing tool for students' work and as a forum for comments and suggestions by teachers and other students. These educators also favor such technologies because they enable discussion outside of the classroom that can involve students and teachers as well as parents.

Some examples of educational use of these technologies:

- Will Richardson, a teacher in New Jersey, set up a blog for student discussion of The Secret Life of Bees and invited author Sue Monk Kidd to join the chat. She was able to answer the students' questions about the book and give more insight than the teacher alone would have been capable. A separate blog was set up to allow parents to discuss the book in parallel with the students.
- Some school administrators are using blogs to communicate news and information about events to parents and students. The homepage for the Meriweather Lewis Elementary School in Oregon is updated with notes from the PTA. The principal and teachers are using blogging software and RSS to allow parents and students to view up-to-date information from the school.
- The Pawtucket Public Library in Pawtucket, Rhode Island is one of a number of public libraries that have created their own MySpace profile webpage. These libraries are attempting to communicate with young adult patrons more effectively through the use of online methods to which young adults are becoming accustomed.
- The Bering Strait School District relies heavily on a MediaWiki-driven curriculum content system. The district's Open Source student information system, DART, links its teachers and students directly to wiki content, as well as many RSS fed district resources, podcasts and vodcasts. Students have contributed many of the wiki's 4800 or so pages for academic credit during school hours. DART tells them what their key weaknesses are, and links to the resources they need to help master those curriculum standards.

The bill would allow minors strictly limited access to those sites. For schools, access would be allowed only with adult supervision and if the site is being used for an educational purpose. For libraries, access would be allowed only if parental authorization is given and the parents are informed that "sexual predators can use these websites and chat rooms to prey on children."

==== The American Library Association ====
The American Library Association is asking its members to oppose DOPA. Former ALA president Michael Gorman said, "We know that the best way to protect children is to teach them to guard their privacy and make wise choices. To this end, libraries across the country offer instruction on safe Internet use". On July 11, 2006, the Executive Director of the Young Adult Library Services Association (YALSA), Beth Yoke, testified before the Subcommittee on Telecommunications and the Internet under the Committee on Energy and Commerce. She defined the ALA and YALSA combined stance on the issue by saying:

Youth librarians believe, and more importantly know from experience, that education about safe Internet practices—for both youth and parents—is the best way to protect young people. We believe that the overly broad technological controls that would be required under DOPA are often ineffective given the fast-moving nature of modern technology. Further, such technological controls often inadvertently obstruct access to beneficial sites. In essence, we believe that this legislation will lead to the blocking of essential and beneficial Interactive Web applications and will further widen the digital divide.

The ALA and other opponents of the bill also believe that this issue is one that should be determined by local authorities, such as local library trustees, community members, and school boards. Opponents argue that this federal action could degrade the authority of those responsible for safe use of the libraries, whereas up to 80% of the funding for the library or school is locally derived.

Following the House vote, the ALA issued a press release recommending libraries demonstrate the utility of the same technologies that would be barred by DOPA. One of the wiki-based resources run by YALSA includes safety instructions for parents and teachers concerning Internet safety, suggestions for concerned individuals to be politically active on the issue, and encouragement for parents and children to sign up for social networking websites.

==== Effectiveness in Protecting Minors ====
Rep. Diane Watson (D-CA) and Rep. John Dingell (D-MI) argued that the bill would fail to combat the threats to minors and that it would place a burden on schools and libraries to block millions of sites with largely innocent information. Rep. Jay Inslee (D-WA) suggested that the law should focus upon directly blocking and prosecuting predators as well as providing tools to educate children on how to avoid dangers—noting that most Internet access, especially to social networking sites, occurs in the home. Education and prevention programs regarding predators and social networking could help reduce the rate of sexual assaults overall—whether over the Internet from home or offline. The Youth Internet Safety Survey from the University of New Hampshire, which was implicitly cited by Rep. Michael Fitzpatrick, found two cases of rape/sexual assault through Internet solicitation in its two surveys covering 3,001 children ages 10 to 17. According to the FBI's criminal victimization tables' national rate for sexual assault, one would expect seven rapes or sexual assaults among such a group every year.

Overall, the Youth Internet Safety Survey suggested that fewer children are actually being sexually solicited online in 2005 than in 1999, hypothesizing that those who encountered solicitations knew better now to rebuff or ignore these solicitations. However, children ages 10 to 17 report more harassment and bullying online—largely from their peers, not adult strangers.

== See also ==
- Communications Act of 1934
- Child Online Protection Act
- Children's Online Privacy Protection Act
