= Suburban Caucus =

American legislative caucus

The Suburban Caucus refers to two separate but related caucuses within the House Republican Conference.

The initial 2004 incarnation was an informal group of over 70 Republican members of the United States House of Representatives with primarily suburban constituencies, founded by Rep. Mark Kirk (R-IL). He planned a suburban agenda in early 2004, made a presentation on it at the party's national convention in New York, formed a House GOP caucus around it and commissioned pollster John McLaughlin to test potential policy items.

From initial membership of 22, it grew to over 50 members. Caucus members included representatives from New York to California, Minnesota to Florida. It included both moderates such as Mike Castle of Delaware and more conservative House members like Pete Sessions of Texas and Tom Feeney of Florida. Their agenda was broken down into four main categories: education, healthcare, conservation and economic issues. Specific points include: keeping child molesters from becoming teachers; making health insurance fully portable; long term saving for children; more cleanup and less court for the superfund environment program; and expanding federal backup to fight international drug gangs.

The second incarnation of group was formed in 2019, including representatives such as Ann Wagner of Missouri and French Hill of Arkansas. It was reformed in the light of the "suburban revolt" during the 2018 midterms, which saw a number of Republicans from urban and suburban areas defeated for re-election, costing the GOP its house majority.

== Legislation supported ==
The initial group supported several pieces of legislation, including

- Health Information Technology Promotion Act (H. R. 4157) setting guidelines to establish electronic medical records
- School Safety Acquiring Faculty Excellence Act (H.R. 4894) linking state and national criminal databases to make sure interstate child molesters are not hired as teachers, coaches or bus drivers.
- Charitable Donations for Open Space Act (H.R. 5056) creating tax easements for charitable donations for open space.
- Gang Elimination Act of 2006 (H.R. 5291) fighting new suburban drug gangs.
- Open Space and Farmland Preservation Act (H.R. 5313) establishing local grant programs to protect suburban open space.
- 401 Kids Family Savings Accounts (H.R. 5314) establishing savings for kids from birth to pay for education or to purchase first home.
- Deleting Online Predators Act (H.R. 5319) protecting children from online predators especially on social networking sites such as MySpace.com.
