= Campbelltown Performing Arts High School =

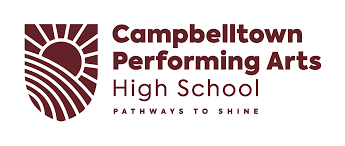

Location
- Beverley Road, Campbelltown, New South Wales; Australia; 34°03′40″S 150°49′22″E

Information
- Type: Government-funded co-educational comprehensive and specialist secondary day school
- Motto: Pathways to Shine
- Founded: 1954; 72 years ago
- School district: Macarthur
- Educational authority: New South Wales Department of Education
- Specialist: Performing arts
- Years: 7–12
- Enrolment: c. 1,000
- Colours: Maroon and gold
- Website: campbellto-h.schools.nsw.gov.au

The Campbelltown Performing Arts High School (abbreviated as CPAHS) is a government-funded co-educational comprehensive and specialist secondary day school with speciality in performing arts, located in Campbelltown, a suburb in south-western Sydney, New South Wales, Australia.

Founded in 1954, CPAHS educates approximately 1,000 students from Year 7 to Year 12 who have enrolled based on local residence and/or selectively in the performing arts division. The school's education curriculum and examinations are governed by the New South Wales Education Standards Authority, a government agency initiative under the administration of the New South Wales Department of Education.

== Notable alumni ==
- Tim Campbell – actor
- Bruce Quick – athlete and Olympian
- Jai Waetford – pop singer, songwriter and actor
- Lisa Wilkinson – journalist and TV presenter

== See also ==
- List of government schools in New South Wales
- List of creative and performing arts high schools in New South Wales
