= Lego Play =

App created by the Lego Group

- Original author: The Lego Group
- Release: July 1, 2024
- Operating system: iOS, Android
- Type: Social media Video game

Lego Play is a mobile app created by the Lego Group and released in July 2024. Acting as the replacement for the Lego Life social media app, it contains other features including minigames, the ability to design virtual creations, as well as a stop motion maker.

== History ==
The platform first entered beta testing under the name Lego Test Zone on the Google Play in September 2023. Lego Play was officially released on July 1, 2024. At the same time, it was announced that Lego Life, the original social media app released by the Lego Group, would be retired the next month. While different from the Lego Life app, it still has the feature for users to post creations.

According to them, the Lego Life app had been developed for a more social media-focused generation, while Lego Play was developed for Generation Alpha, who they believed to be more focused on gaming. The app had received over five million downloads by the end of 2024.

In August 2025, the Lego Group partnered with Aardman Animations to produce the Boop series of animated shorts. Users of the app were encouraged to use the built-in stop motion maker to complete the story.

In September 2025, it was reported that users in Australia may be required to be at least 16 to join the app as part of Australia's ban on social media for users under that age. However, the app was ultimately among the ten platforms excluded from the ban.
