= 6 News Australia =

Teenager-run news channel

- Headquarters: Melbourne, Victoria, Australia

Ownership
- Owner: Leo Puglisi

History
- Launched: 20 March 2019
- Founder: Leo Puglisi
- Former names: HMV Local News & HMV News (2019−2020)

Links
- Website: 6newsau.com

6 News Australia (also known simply as 6 News, formerly known as HMV Local News and formerly on videos as HMV News or HMV-6) is a streaming news channel based in Melbourne, Australia. The channel is known for a large portion of its journalists being teenagers.

== History ==
6 News was founded in 2019 as HMV Local News by Leo Puglisi, who was 11 years old at the time. The channel changed its name to 6 News on 1 January 2020.

The channel gained national media attention in early 2022 during the federal election campaign, after conducting interviews with then-Prime Minister Scott Morrison and then-Opposition Leader Anthony Albanese.

After Labor senator Fatima Payman crossed the floor to support recognising the State of Palestine, 6 News was the first news outlet to interview her.

In July 2026, the ownership of 6 News transferred from Atelier Puglisi Pty Ltd to Leo Puglisi.

The outlet was previously a member of the Local & Independent News Association (LINA), but deregistered in early 2026.

6 News is one of only three youth-based outlets that operates in Australia, the other two being The Daily Aus and Slam! News Australia.

== Controversies ==
=== 2021 YouTube COVID-19 Misinformation Suspension ===
In August 2021, the channel was suspended by YouTube for a week after uploading a video of then-MP George Christensen, which violated YouTube's policy against COVID-19 misinformation. The suspension was overturned after it was determined "there was sufficient context" to allow the video to be published.

=== Basil Zempilas controversy ===
In January 2024, then-Perth Lord Mayor Basil Zempilas was captured on a hot mic apparently referring to the Australian Open women's final as a "reserve game", prior to a press conference announcing he was joining the Liberal Party. A clip of the comment was posted on X (formerly Twitter) by 6 News.

Zempilas later said that he was taken out of context, and that he was referring to a "derby" between reporter Michael Genovese and his partner hosting the news on different channels, which Genovese later confirmed. 6 News deleted their post and Puglisi stated that the channel's practices would be reviewed.

=== "Liberal Plant" Conspiracy Theories ===
During and after the 2022 federal election, founder Leo Puglisi faced a barrage of online harassment, targeting, and conspiracy theories from critics on social media. Some accused him of being "right wing" or a "Murdoch plant".
