= Intrepid Travel =

Travel company

- Type: Tour operator
- Industry: Tourism
- Founded: 1989; 37 years ago
- Founders: Darrell Wade; Geoff Manchester
- Headquarters: Melbourne, Australia
- Number of locations: Melbourne, London, Toronto, Seattle
- Key people: James Thornton, CEO
- Products: Escorted tours
- Revenue: A$626 million
- Operating income: A$42.9 million
- Number of employees: 1,465 or 3,399 including tour leaders and crew
- Website: www.intrepidtravel.com

Intrepid Travel is a small group tour operator company. The company offers 1,057 escorted tours worldwide with an average of 10 travellers per tour. It also owns several boutique hotels.

Tours are led by local tour leaders, often use public transport and stay at locally owned accommodation. The company's headquarters are in Melbourne where it was founded with more than 30 offices worldwide, including Melbourne, London, Colombo, Toronto, and Seattle. The company creates and operates its own tours and operates tours for other companies through its destination management company, Intrepid DMC.

Intrepid Travel is majority owned by its co-founders and staff, via a company share scheme. Genairgy, the investment fund of the founding family of Decathlon, owns a minority interest in Intrepid.

== History ==
The company was founded in 1989 by two Australian university friends, Darrell Wade and Geoff "Manch" Manchester, after they quit their jobs and organized a six-month trip around Africa. The cofounders set out to create a new type of travel that gave back to the people and places that it visits. In its first year, Intrepid carried 46 passengers, with Geoff Manchester as its first tour leader, leading trips in Thailand.

In 2011, TUI Group acquired 60% of the company. However, in 2015, the founders re-acquired those shares after a disagreement in vision with TUI Group.

In 2021, Genairgy, the investment fund of the founding family of Decathlon, acquired a minority interest in the company.

In January 2022, the company acquired Wildland Trekking.

In February 2025, the company acquired Sawadee Reizen, which had $62 million in annual revenue, from Travelopia.

In 2026, Intrepid Travel launched Stay Intrepid, its first accommodation collection, comprising six independently bookable properties in Australia and Morocco.

== Corporate responsibility ==
Intrepid Foundation has raised more than A$20 million to support communities where it travels.

The company has a focus on responsible travel and is a signatory to the United Nations Global Compact.

In 2010, Intrepid Travel became a carbon neutral business.

In 2020, it became the first global tour operator with a verified carbon emissions target from the Science Based Targets initiative.

At COP26, the company became a signatory and launch partner to the Glasgow Declaration for Climate Action in Tourism which commits to actions to support the global commitment to halve emissions by 2030 and reach Net Zero as soon as possible before 2050.

In 2014, after funding research by World Animal Protection, it was the first tour operator to ban elephant rides on its tours, which lead to other major tour operators banning elephant rides.

In 2015, it donated the profits from tours in Nepal to rebuild the country after the April 2015 Nepal earthquake.

In 2017, the company set a goal to double its number of female tour leaders. In 2019, it reached its goal with 342 female leaders.

In June 2018, it launched vegan tours.

In August 2018, it became a certified B Corporation.

In 2020 and 2021, its not-for-profit arm "The Intrepid Foundation" supported vulnerable communities impacted by the COVID-19 pandemic, including delivering food packages to families in remote parts of Peru and raising funds for essential medical equipment, including oxygen tanks, in India.

In 2021, it launched a vaccine equity advocacy and fundraising campaign to raise $150,000 in support of UNICEF Australia to help deliver vaccines to the world’s most vulnerable countries and communities.

== See also ==
- Travel plan
- TUI Travel
