= Intelligent Car Initiative =

European Union policy framework

The Intelligent Car Initiative was a policy framework set up by the European Commission to tie up all activities relating to 'intelligent' automobiles. The term covered all vehicles that are equipped with modern information and communication technologies (ICT) to increase road safety and/or the flow of traffic or to reduce the environmental impact of road transport. A well-established and widely known 'intelligent' device would be the anti-lock braking system (ABS), which prevents the wheels from locking while braking and thus enables the driver to keep the car under control. An example for a more recent system would be the electronic brake assistance, which helps the driver brake effectively or even brakes the car on its own if a collision is imminent and there is no driver reaction at all.

== Beginnings and objectives ==
The Intelligent Car Initiative was founded by Commission Communication of 15 February 2006, and presented to the public in Brussels/Belgium a week later, on 23 February 2006. Its objective is to improve road safety in the European Union and in particular to cut back the number of annually more than 40,000 road fatalities and 1.2m accidents on the Union's roads, to decrease the number of traffic jams, and to reduce fuel consumption and road transport's CO² emissions.

== Structure and working fields ==
The Intelligent Car Initiative rests on three pillars:

- The eSafety Forum. The Commission builds on the eSafety Forum (eSafety's 'Parliament') to coordinate all stakeholders having an interest in road traffic safety or a speedier deployment of advanced, ICT-based safety systems. In this respect, the eSafety Initiative, which was already founded in 2002, was a kind of precursor of the Intelligent Car Initiative
- Research projects in information and communication technologies, as far as they explore road safety, traffic, and 'clean mobility' management projects. This holds for the 6th and 7th European Framework Programmes for Research
- Awareness-raising activities, designed to increase the knowledge of drivers, consumers, and decision makers of these 'intelligent' car safety systems. The commission's own 'Intelligent Car website', which hosts, among other things, an interactive quiz, is part of these awareness-raising actions.

== Priority setting ==
Due to the great number and variety of possible activities and actions in the field of the 'intelligent' car, the commission announced in its first review of the Intelligent Car Initiative that it would give priority to four particularly important challenges. These are:

- The introduction, as of September 2010, of the pan-European automatic emergency call system eCall,
- Mandatory fitting of electronic stability control in all new cars as of 2014,
- A stronger focus on less fuel consumption and CO₂ reduction,
- The safe fixing and use in the car of mobile electronic consumer products such as cell phones or navigation systems.

In collaboration with the European research project 'PReVENT,' the report was presented to the international media and an expert public in the framework of a conference on 'intelligent' cars. The conference, which was accompanied by a large exhibition, took place in Versailles, France, on 18 September 2007. On this occasion, the initiator of the Intelligent Car Initiative, Ms Viviane Reding, European Commissioner for the Information Society and Media, was accompanied by Ms Valérie Pécresse, French Minister of Research and Higher Education; Mr Gang Wan, Chinese Minister of Science and Technology; and Mr Mario Lino Soares Correia, Portuguese Minister of Transport and Telecommunications. Their presence proved the growing interest in and importance of 'intelligent' cars.
