= Julie Inman Grant =

American and Australian public servant

Julie Inman Grant PSM
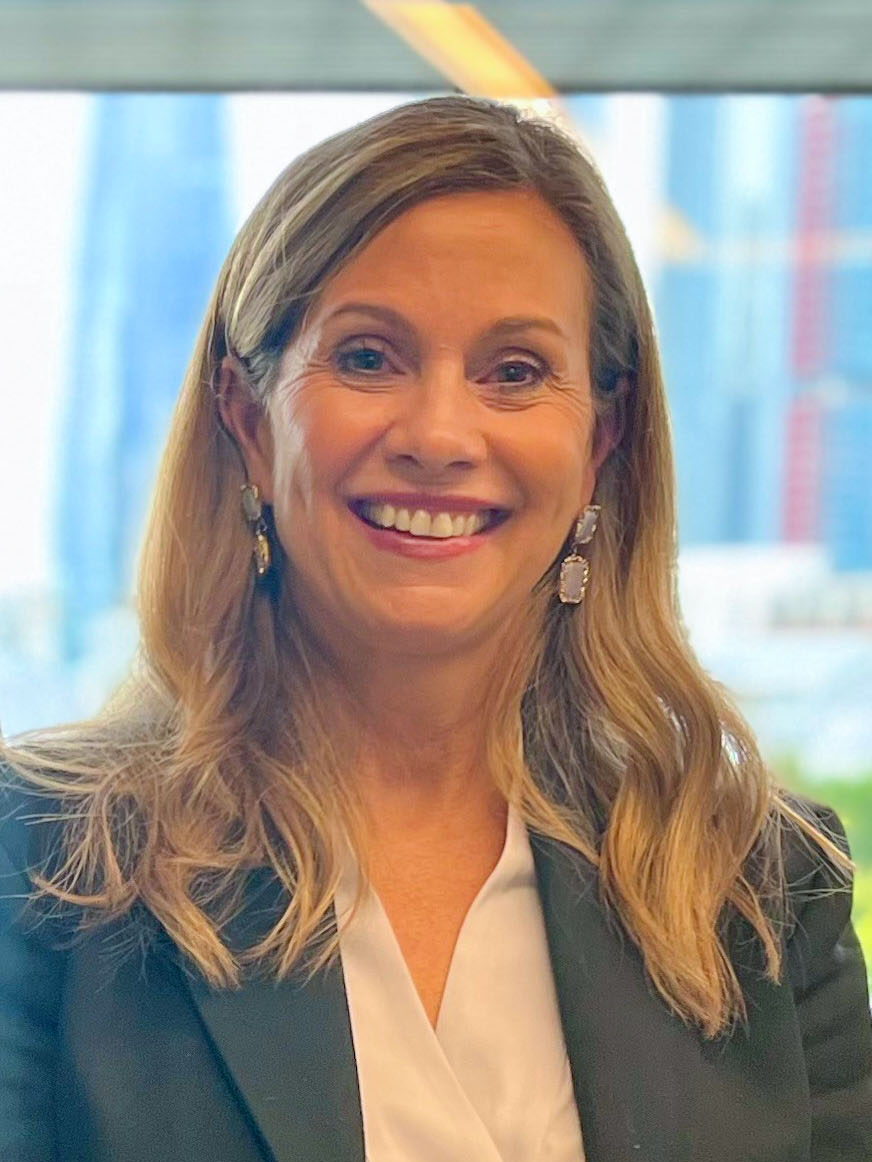
- Julie Inman Grant, 2024

eSafety Commissioner
- Incumbent
- Assumed office January 2017
- Preceded by: Alastair MacGibbon

Personal details
- Born: Seattle, Washington, US
- Citizenship: United States, Australia
- Website: www.esafety.gov.au

Julie Inman Grant PSM is an American and Australian public servant who is currently employed as the eSafety Commissioner, a role in which she leads Australia's regulator for online safety.

== Career ==
Grant initially studied computer science in college before dropping out to pursue international relations, graduating BA in International Relations from Boston University, an MA in International Communication from American University and is a Certified Information Privacy Professional (CIPP/US).

After graduating from university in the early 1990s, Grant was offered a position as a "case agent with the CIA", but declined the offer as it meant "I wouldn't be able to tell my friends and family what I was doing". Grant subsequently started working in the public sector as a policy adviser for Republican United States Congressman John Miller in 1991 and 1992.

From 1995 to 2000, Grant worked as a government affairs manager for Microsoft. In 2000, Grant moved to Australia, and became head of corporate affairs at Microsoft until 2004.

In 2005, Grant became the Asia-Pacific director of internet safety, privacy and security at Microsoft, serving in that capacity until 2009 when she became global director for safety and privacy policy and outreach.

In 2014, Grant became director of public policy in Australia and south-east Asia at Twitter. In 2016, Grant moved to the role of director of government relations in the Asia-Pacific region at Adobe.

Grant was awarded the Public Service Medal in the 2026 Australia Day Honours for "outstanding public service to the improvement of online safety for Australians".

== Role as eSafety Commissioner ==
In January 2017, Grant was appointed by the Australian government as the national eSafety Commissioner, a position established in July 2015 by prime minister Tony Abbott, under the Enhancing Online Safety for Children Act 2015. In January 2022, Grant was reappointed in her role as commissioner of eSafety for a further five years.

In April 2024, Grant ordered Twitter and Meta to remove footage of the stabbing of Mar Mari Emmanuel. The order was met with resistance from Elon Musk and prompted a protracted debate about free speech, with Musk refusing to delete the videos although it had blocked the content in Australia.. Musk would also call Grant an "e-Karen and e-Slut". This label was adopted by several commentators on the political right, including Sky News and senator Ralph Babet.

A two-day injunction to compel Twitter to hide posts that include the footage of the attack was later extended to 10 May 2024. She dropped the case on 6 June, but stated that she would continue to pursue legal action against Twitter in the Administrative Appeals Tribunal. She also stated that her role in the federal court case led to her and her family being doxed and harassed online.

In 2025, Grant took charge of implementing the social media ban for people under the age of 16 in Australia legislated via the Online Safety Amendment.

== Personal life ==
Grant has three children and is married to Nick Grant, who is Australian. She holds Australian and US citizenship.
