= Hawthorn West Primary School =

Coordinates: 37.8201°S 145.0180°E

Location
- Hawthorn, Victoria; Australia

Information
- Established: 28 February 1853
- Principal: Nerida Smith

Hawthorn West Primary School is a primary school located in the Melbourne, Australia suburb of Hawthorn. It was established in 1853, and is one of the oldest schools in Victoria.

== History ==
The school was opened on 28 February 1853, known at the time as Hawthorn School. It became a common school in 1862, and a state school sometime in the 1870s. For a period beginning in 1918, the school taught students in grades 7 and 8.

The school was renamed to Hawthorn West Primary School in 1970.

In October 2019, the school was the subject of national media attention after a 5-year-old student began wetting himself after being bullied in school bathrooms for being Jewish. A review was ordered into the school by then-Education Minister James Merlino.

== Notable alumni ==
- Robert DiPierdomenico, former Hawthorn footballer
- David Parkin, former Hawthorn footballer
- Ron Steiner, former Victorian Rugby Union general manager
- Steve Vizard, media personality
