= Control software =

Control software may refer to:

- Content-control software, which restricts the content a reader is authorised to access
- Remote desktop software, which allows a computer's desktop environment to be controlled remotely
- Version control software, which manages changes to documents, code, and other collections of information
- Remote monitoring and control, in various settings
  - Industrial control systems such as SCADA, which implement control systems in industrial settings

== See also ==
- Control panel (software), which allows control of software and hardware features
