= Youth Internet Safety Survey =

Cybercrime

The Youth Internet Safety Survey was a series of two surveys conducted in the United States in 1999 and 2004. The National Center for Missing & Exploited Children (NCMEC) provided funding to Dr. David Finkelhor, Director of the Crimes Against Children Research Center at the University of New Hampshire, to conduct a research survey in 1999 on Internet victimization of youth. His research was cited by the United States Department of Justice as "the best profile of this problem to date".

Crimes Against Children Research Center staff interviewed a nationally representative sample youth, aged 10 to 17, who used the Internet regularly. There were 1501 subjects in the first survey in 1999, and 1500 in the second survey in 2005.

Results from the surveys have been quoted in support of the Deleting Online Predators Act of 2006, saying that "one in five children had received an unwanted online solicitation of a sexual nature". This is a reference to the 19% found in the first survey (see "First Survey" below). This is potentially misleading, since some have interpreted this as implying adults soliciting offline sexual contact from children. The 19% includes solicitation from minors to minors, and are not generally requests for physical/"offline" contact. The same survey found that none of the solicitations led to an actual sexual contact or assault.

The more complete results and recommendations are included below.

== Definitions ==
Internet user: using the Internet at least once a month for the past six months at home, school, a library, or some other place.

Sexual solicitations and approaches: Requests to engage in sexual activities or sexual talk or give personal sexual information that were unwanted or, whether wanted or not, made by an adult. Note that this includes solicitation from other minors, so unwanted advances by a 13-year-old on a 14-year-old are included in this.

Aggressive sexual solicitation: Sexual solicitations involving offline contact with the perpetrator through regular mail, by telephone, or in person or attempts or requests for offline contact.

Unwanted exposure to sexual material: Without seeking or expecting sexual material, being exposed to pictures of naked people or people having sex when doing online searches, surfing the web, opening E-mail or instant messages, or opening links in E-mail or instant messages.

Harassment: Threats or other offensive behavior (not sexual solicitation), sent online to the youth or posted online about the youth for others to see.

Not all such incidents were distressing to the youth who experienced them. Distressing incidents were episodes where youth rated themselves as very or extremely upset or afraid as a result of the incident.

== First Survey (1999) ==
Known as YISS-1. This was conducted between August 1999 and February 2000. It interviewed 1501 youth Internet users, ages 10 through 17.

=== Highlights of Results ===
Regarding "Sexual Solicitations and Approaches", the survey found:

- 19 percent of the young Internet users surveyed received an unwanted sexual solicitation in the past year.
- 5 percent of the surveyed youth received a distressing sexual solicitation (i.e., the solicitation made them feel very or extremely upset or afraid).
- 3 percent of the youth received an aggressive solicitation involving offline contact or attempts or requests for offline contact.
- None of the solicitations led to an actual sexual contact or assault.

One-third of the surveyed youth who had received a solicitation were male; two-thirds were female. The great majority (77 percent) of the victims were 14 to 17 years old; however, almost one quarter were ages 10 to 13. The younger group reported 37 percent of the distressing solicitations.

Regarding "Unwanted Exposure to Sexual Material", the survey found:

- 25 percent of the surveyed youth reported unwanted exposures to sexual material.
- 6 percent of the youth had experienced distressing exposures (i.e., the exposure made them very or extremely upset).

A slightly higher percentage of boys than girls reported exposures (57 percent vs. 42 percent) or distressing exposures (55 percent vs. 45 percent). Almost two-thirds of exposures were to youth ages 15 to 17. Less than one-tenth were to 11- and 12-year-olds, and none to 10-year-olds.

Regarding harassment, the survey found:

- Six percent of the young people surveyed reported harassment incidents (threats, rumors, or other offensive behavior) during the past year.
- Two percent of the surveyed youth reported episodes of distressing harassment (i.e., the incident made them feel very or extremely upset or afraid).

== Second Survey (2004) ==
Known as YISS-2. This was conducted between March and June 2005. It interviewed 1500 youth Internet users, ages 10 through 17.

=== Highlights of Results ===
Regarding "Sexual Solicitations and Approaches", the survey found:

- 13 percent of the young Internet users surveyed received an unwanted sexual solicitation in the past year. This is a decrease from the 19 percent found in the prior survey.
- 4 percent of the surveyed youth received a distressing sexual solicitation (i.e., the solicitation made them feel very or extremely upset or afraid). This is approximately the same as the 5 percent found in the prior survey.
- 4 percent of the youth received an aggressive solicitation involving offline contact or attempts or requests for offline contact. This is approximately the same as the 3 percent found in the prior survey.
- Two of the solicitations (0.1 percent) lead to sexual assault, compared to zero cases of sexual contact or assault in the prior survey. For comparison, according to the FBI's criminal victimization tables' national rate for sexual assault, one would expect 4 rapes or sexual assaults every year in a group of youth this size.

Regarding "Unwanted Exposure to Sexual Material", the survey found:

- 34 percent of the surveyed youth reported unwanted exposures to sexual material. This is a marked increase from the 25% found in the prior survey.
- 9 percent of the youth had experienced distressing exposures (i.e., the exposure made them very or extremely upset). This is a rough equal increase from the 6% found in the prior survey. The study attributed this rise in part to aggressive tactics by pornography marketers, and the increased speed and capacity of computers and Internet connections to transmit images.

Regarding harassment, the survey found:

- 9 percent of the young people surveyed reported harassment incidents (threats, rumors, or other offensive behavior). This is a marked increase from the 6% found in the prior survey. Study authors said it was consistent with growing indicators of online incivility among youth.
- 3 percent of the surveyed youth reported episodes of distressing harassment (i.e., the incident made them feel very or extremely upset or afraid). This is a roughly equal increase from the 2% found in the prior survey.
