= ESafety Commissioner =

Australian independent government office

Office of the eSafety Commissioner

Agency overview
- Formed: 1 July 2015; 10 years ago
- Jurisdiction: Australian Government
- Minister responsible: Anika Wells, Minister for Communications
- Agency executive: Julie Inman Grant, eSafety Commissioner
- Parent agency: Australian Communications and Media Authority
- Key document: Online Safety Act 2021 (Cth)
- Website: www.esafety.gov.au

The eSafety Commissioner (eSafety) is an independent agency of the Australian government responsible for the regulation of online safety. The commission has no ongoing employees; it draws resources from the Australian Communications and Media Authority (ACMA) as required.

In January 2014, the original legislation had a clear focus on responding to cyberbullying against children, until ACMA set up the Office of the Children's eSafety Commissioner as an independent statutory authority under the Enhancing Online Safety for Children Act 2015.

In June 2021, the Australian parliament enacted the Online Safety Act 2021. The Act consolidated the legislative arrangements for eSafety and established updated schemes to keep Australians safe online, including a new scheme to address serious online abuse of adults. It commenced on 23 January 2022. In December 2024, the Online Safety Amendment was passed by parliament and aims to prevent children under the age of 16 from accessing certain social media platforms. The regulations specify exactly which types of social media platforms will be banned.

In July 2025, the eSafety Commissioner criticised YouTube for turning a "blind eye" to child abuse.

Since 2017, the commissioner has been Julie Inman Grant. She was reappointed to a second five-year term in 2022.

In 2026, the Federal Court in eSafety Commissioner v Baumgarten [2026] FCAFC 12, held that informal requests by the Commissioner to remove online content could be subject to merits review. The case involved a request made outside formal statutory powers under the Online Safety Act 2021 (Cth), which was nonetheless treated by a platform as requiring compliance. The Court rejected the Commissioner’s argument that such actions were not reviewable. Data published in the Australian Communications and Media Authority and eSafety Commissioner annual report for 2024–25 indicated that the Commissioner issued only four formal takedown notices for adult cyber abuse material during that period, compared with 219 informal requests to platforms for content removal. Constitutional professor Anne Twomey suggested that the eSafety Commission exploited its government authority by acting informally outside the scope of its statutory powers.
