= Ian Watmore =

British civil servant (born 1958)

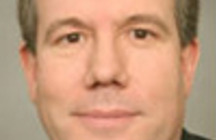

First Civil Service Commissioner
- In office 1 October 2016 – 30 September 2021
- Prime Minister: Theresa May; Boris Johnson
- Preceded by: Sir David Normington
- Succeeded by: Gisela Stuart

Cabinet Office Permanent Secretary
- In office 1 January 2012 – June 2012
- Prime Minister: David Cameron
- Minister: Francis Maude
- Preceded by: Sir Gus O'Donnell
- Succeeded by: Richard Heaton

Chief Operating Officer of the Cabinet Office
- In office 2010–2011
- Prime Minister: David Cameron
- Minister: Francis Maude

Permanent Secretary of the Department for Innovation, Universities and Skills
- In office 2007–2009
- Prime Minister: Gordon Brown
- Minister: John Denham
- Succeeded by: Sir Jon Shortridge

Head of Prime Minister's Delivery Unit, 10 Downing Street
- In office 2005–2007
- Prime Minister: Tony Blair
- Preceded by: Sir Michael Barber
- Succeeded by: Ray Shostak

Chief Information Officer of the Cabinet Office
- In office 2004–2005
- Prime Minister: Tony Blair
- Minister: Douglas Alexander; Alan Milburn; John Hutton
- Preceded by: Andrew Pinder
- Succeeded by: John Suffolk

Personal details
- Born: Ian Charles Watmore; 5 July 1958 (age 68) Croydon, Surrey, England
- Children: Duncan Watmore
- Education: Trinity College, Cambridge

Ian Charles Watmore (born 5 July 1958) is a British management consultant and former senior civil servant under three prime ministers, who served from October 2016 to September 2021 as the First Civil Service Commissioner.

== Early life and business career ==
Born in Croydon, Surrey, he was educated at the Trinity School of John Whitgift and then graduated with a degree in mathematics and management studies from Trinity College, Cambridge. He trained as a management consultant with Andersen Consulting, and ultimately became Accenture's managing director for the United Kingdom from 2000 to 2004.

This career involved IT and consulting in the private sector, and involved him joining the board of e-skills UK, the Sector Skills Council for IT, from 2000 until 2006, and serving as the president of the Management Consultants Association from 2003 to 2004.

== Government career ==
Watmore joined the civil service of the United Kingdom as the first Government Chief Information Officer (GCIO), taking over as head of the e-Government Unit, the direct successor to the Office of the e-Envoy in September 2004. Fifteen months later, at the end of 2005, the Cabinet Office announced that Watmore was that next month to succeed his boss Sir Michael Barber, as the second ever head of the Prime Minister's Delivery Unit, reporting directly to the Prime Minister and the Cabinet Secretary.

Formally the "Chief Advisor to Prime Minister on Delivery", Watmore appointed John Suffolk, the Director General of Criminal Justice IT as his replacement GCIO in May, and Andrew Stott as his deputy on the GCTO side. In June 2007, following the reshuffle when Gordon Brown became Prime Minister, Watmore was appointed as the inaugural Permanent Secretary of the new Department for Innovation, Universities and Skills, working for the Secretary of State John Denham.

Eighteen months later, it was announced that Watmore would leave the Civil Service to be the new Chief Executive of The Football Association, succeeding Brian Barwick starting the job in June 2009. He resigned from this post nine months later, on 19 March 2010, and was replaced by Alex Horne, initially in an acting capacity and later as General Secretary.

Three months later, following the General Election, Watmore returned to government as the Chief Operating Officer of the Cabinet Office, heading up the newly formed Efficiency and Reform Group.

Sixteen months after that, on 11 October 2011 it was announced that Watmore would become Permanent Secretary to the Cabinet Office, replacing Sir (now Lord) Gus O'Donnell, whose three roles were split after his retirement at the end of 2011. However, he only held this role for six months, announcing in May 2012 that he was resigning to spend more time with his family. He was replaced by Richard Heaton.

In September 2016, it was announced that Watmore would succeed Sir David Normington as the independent First Civil Service Commissioner regulator of the Civil Service from 1 October 2016. for a non renewable five year term.

== Other roles ==
Watmore was a member of the advisory board of Westminster Business School from 2010 to 2013, and has been a board member of the Information Commissioner's Office since 2012. He has been a trustee of the Migraine Trust since 2008, serving as its Chair since 2010. Watmore has been a Church Commissioner since 2014, and his wife is a priest in the Church of England in the Diocese of Chester.

Watmore is a lifelong supporter of Arsenal, and has had several sport related appointments. He has been a board member of the English Institute of Sport since 2002, and in March 2012, he joined the England Rugby 2015 board. He is the non executive chair of Quantum Sport, a sports agency which represents his son, Duncan, who is a professional footballer. He had been chair of the England and Wales Cricket Board since 1 September 2020. On 7 October 2021, he stepped down as ECB Chairman with immediate effect, after serving only 13 months of his five-year term.

== Offices held ==
Business positions
Preceded by Mark McRae Otway	Managing Director, Accenture UK; 2000–2004	Succeeded by Lis Astall
Government offices
Preceded by Andrew Pinder as Head, Office of the e-Envoy	Government Chief Information Officer and Head of the E-Government Unit, Cabinet Office; September 2004–January 2006	Succeeded by John Suffolk as Government Chief Information Officer
Preceded by Andrew Pinder as Head, Office of the e-Envoy	Government Chief Information Officer and Head of the E-Government Unit, Cabinet Office; September 2004–January 2006	Succeeded by Andrew Stott as Government Chief Technology Officer
Preceded by Sir Michael Barber	Head, Prime Minister's Delivery Unit, Number 10; 2006–2007	Succeeded by Ray Shostak
New office	Permanent Secretary at the Department for Innovation, Universities and Skills; June 2007–2009	Succeeded by Sir Jon Shortridge
New office	Chief Operating Officer of the Efficiency and Reform Group, Cabinet Office and HM Treasury; June 2007–2009	Succeeded by himself as Permanent Secretary of the Cabinet Office
Preceded by Sir Gus O'Donnell	Permanent Secretary at the Cabinet Office; January–June 2012	Succeeded by Richard Heaton
Preceded by Sir David Normington	First Civil Service Commissioner; 1 October 2016–present	Succeeded by Incumbent
Sporting positions
Preceded by Brian Barwick	Chief Executive of The Football Association; June 2009–March 2010	Succeeded by Alex Horne as General Secretary
