= Ben Terrett =

British designer

Ben Terrett CBE RDI
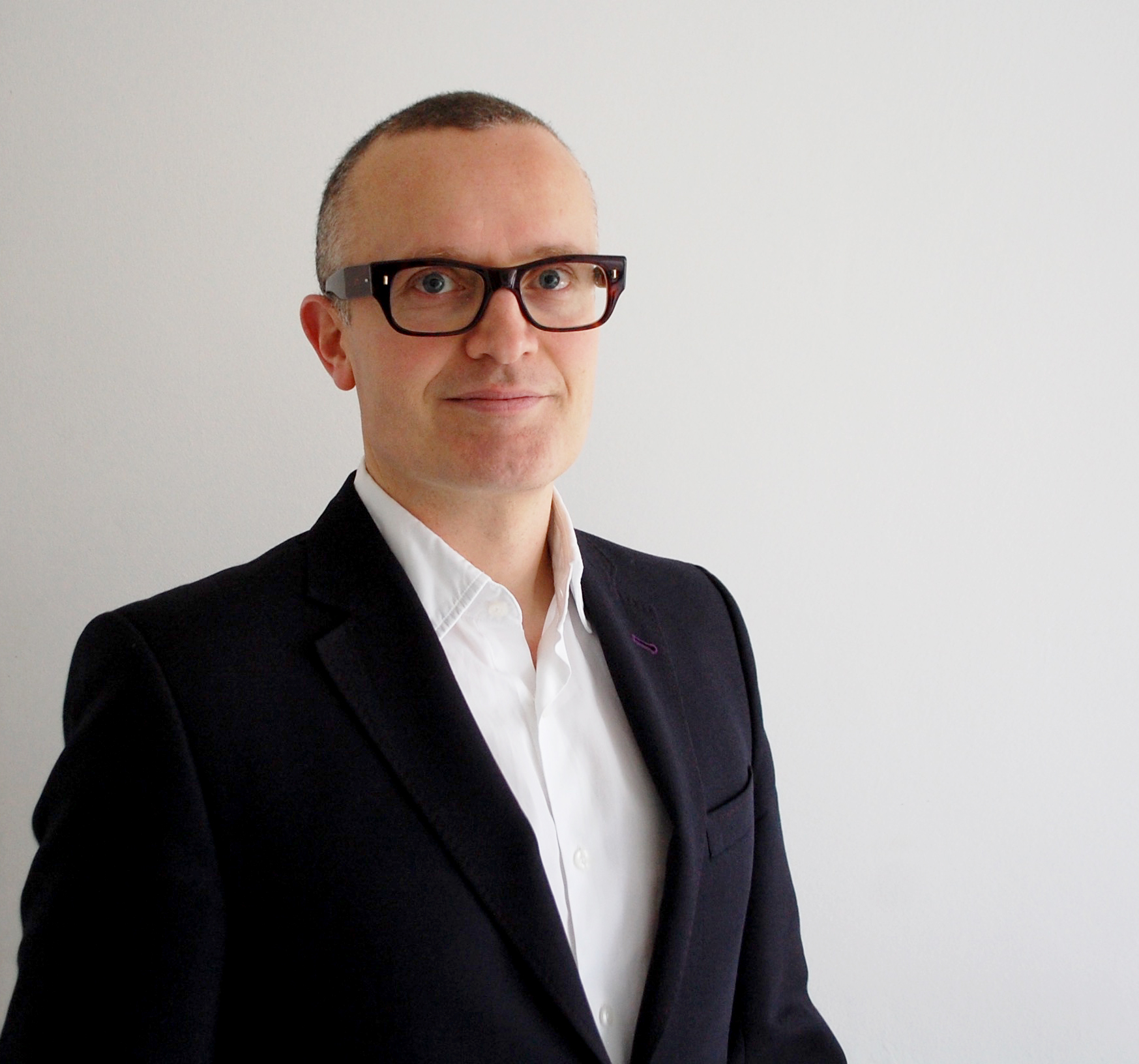
- Terrett in 2018

Personal details
- Born: Ben Terrett; 1975 (age 50–51)
- Occupation: Designer
- Awards: CBE; Royal Designer for Industry; Honorary Doctorate in Design from Central Saint Martins; Design Week Hall of Fame; Design Museum's Design of the Year; D&AD "Black Pencil"
- Website: benterrett.com

Ben Terrett CBE RDI (born 1975) is a British designer. He was the first Royal Designer for Industry elected for Service Design and has won the Design Museum's Design of the Year, a D&AD "Black Pencil" and is in the Design Week Hall of Fame. Terrett specialises in large digital projects and is most well known for his work designing the GOV.UK website.

Terrett co-authored the UK Government Design Principles which Tim O'Reilly called "the most significant since Apple's". Terrett has said "Every designer should work in the public sector." As of February 2019 he is the CEO of Public Digital. He was previously Deputy Chair at University of the Arts London

He was appointed Commander of the Order of the British Empire (CBE) in the 2025 King's Birthday Honours List for services to design.

== Early life ==
Terrett was born in 1975. He grew up "in a small village in Wiltshire". He studied Graphic Design and Illustration at De Montfort University. In 1997 he won the Royal Society of Arts Student Design Awards prize for Interactive Graphics.

== Career ==
=== Early career ===
In 2001 he set up The Design Conspiracy, a graphic design agency. The agency created the website What Brand Are You? which gained notoriety when the spoof names were registered for real. In 2008 he co-founded Newspaper Club with Russell Davies and Tom Taylor. From 2008 to 2011 Terrett worked at the London office of Wieden+Kennedy as the Design Director and the Creative Director on the Guardian and Nike Grid accounts.

=== Government Digital Service ===
From 2011 to 2015 Terrett was Director of Design in the Government Digital Service in the Cabinet Office. He led a team of multi-disciplinary designers who designed GOV.UK. In 2013 GOV.UK was the first digital project to win the Design Museum's Design of the Year award. GOV.UK also won a D&AD "Black Pencil" award. The Government Digital Service has been used as case study at the Harvard Kennedy School of Government.

On leaving the Government Digital Service, Terrett said "Every designer should work in the public sector". "In an industry so often obsessed with novelty and persuasion, government is a chance to do real design work. If the government started a fast stream programme for design grads it would start to change the industry and make services better at the same time".

Terrett has co-authored a book about his time in government: Digital Transformation at Scale: Why the Strategy Is Delivery.

=== Post GDS and Public Digital ===
In 2015 he left GDS and joined the Co-operative Group as Group Design Director, shortly before the launch of the company's re-brand by design agency North.

Terrett is currently CEO of a consultancy company, Public Digital which he set up in 2018 with Mike Bracken and others. In 2025 Public Digital was awarded one of The King's Awards for Enterprise for International Trade.

== Other roles ==
Terrett is a member of the High Speed 2 Design Panel and a Non Executive Director at Lexington Communications. Previously he was Deputy Chair at University of the Arts London, a Deputy President of D&AD, and an advisor to the London Design Festival.

In 2020 as Deputy President of D&AD he was due to become the organisation's President. He declined the Presidency citing the lack of diversity in similar industry roles saying "I look around at the world and I see too many people who look like me, middle-aged white men, in positions like this, so I've decided to stand aside and make space for others." Naresh Ramchandani from Pentagram became President instead. Terrett remained a Trustee for a further year.

His work has been exhibited in the Royal Academy Summer Exhibition.

== Honours and awards ==
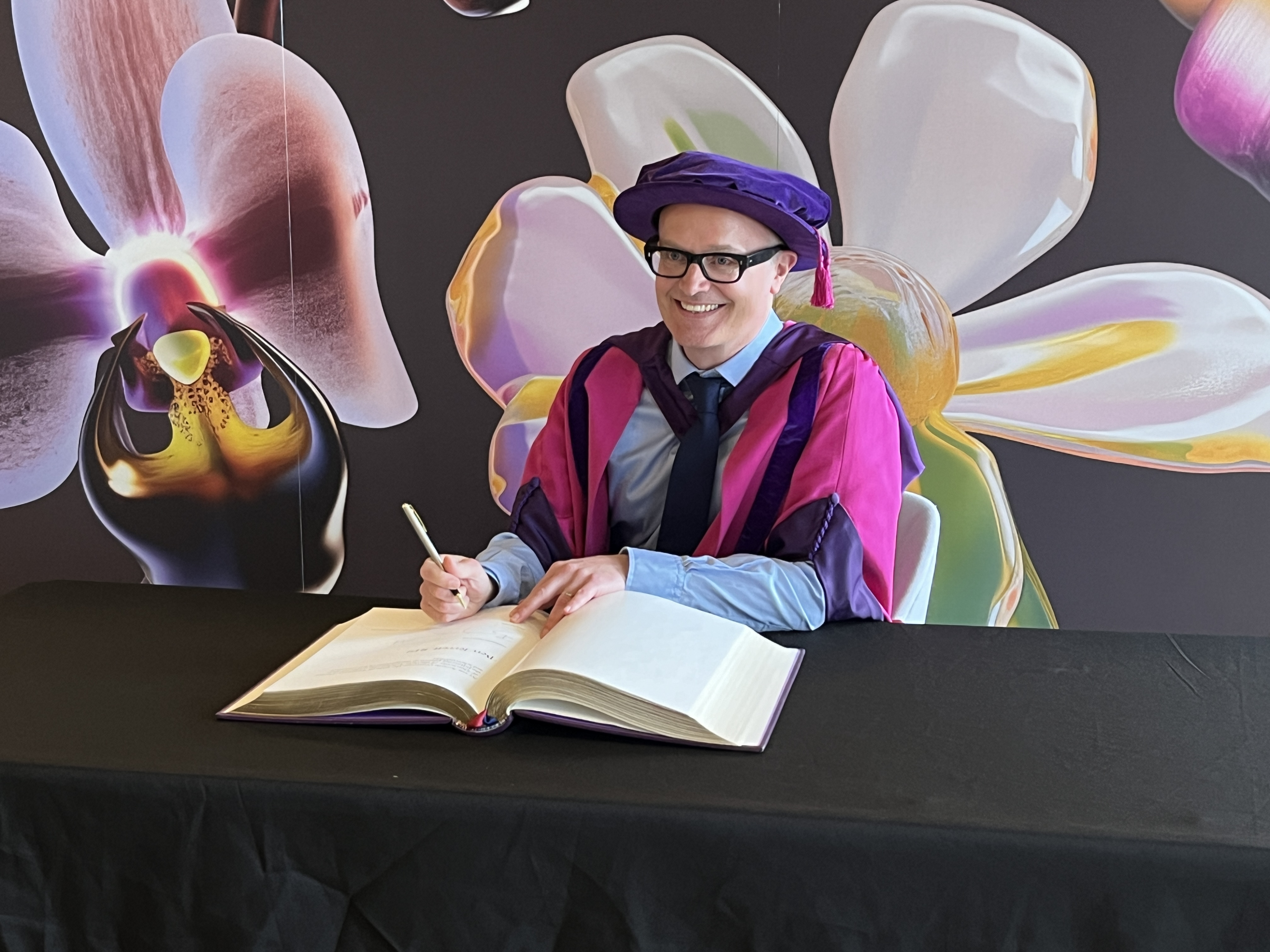
Terrett receiving an Honorary Doctorate from Central Saint Martins 2024

- Winner, Graphics Category Design Museum Design of the Year for Newspaper Club, 2010
- Winner Overall, Design Museum Design of the Year for GOV.UK, 2013
- Winner, D&AD Black Pencil for GOV.UK, 2013
- Design Week Hall of Fame, 2017
- Royal Designer for Industry for Service Design, 2018
- Awarded an Honorary Doctorate in Design from Central Saint Martins, 2024.

== Bibliography ==
=== Books ===
- Digital Transformation at Scale: Why the Strategy Is Delivery (2018) ISBN 9781907994784 (London Publishing Partnership, May 2018)
- Digital Transformation at Scale: Why the Strategy Is Delivery (Revised second edition 2021) ISBN 9781913019396 (London Publishing Partnership, September 2021)
- Public Digital – 巨大な官僚制組織をシンプルで機敏なデジタル組織に変えるには (Japanese edition 2022) ASIN B0B748TKDW (英治出版, August 3, 2022)

=== Notable lectures ===
6 September 2009 Terrett spoke at Kyoorius Designyatra in Mumbai, India.

12 March 2012 at SXSW in Austin Texas, Terrett spoke on a panel which introduced the concept The New Aesthetic organised by James Bridle and included Aaron Cope, Joanne McNeil and Russell Davies.

28 February 2013 Terrett was a speaker at the Design Indaba in Cape Town, South Africa.

10 March 2014 Terrett spoke at the Bloomberg Businessweek Design conference in San Francisco, California.

23 September 2015 Terrett gave the Royal Society of Arts Student Design Awards Keynote in London: 'From persuasion to usability; Design meets the internet'.
