= Mike Bracken =

Public sector technology leader

Mike Bracken CBE
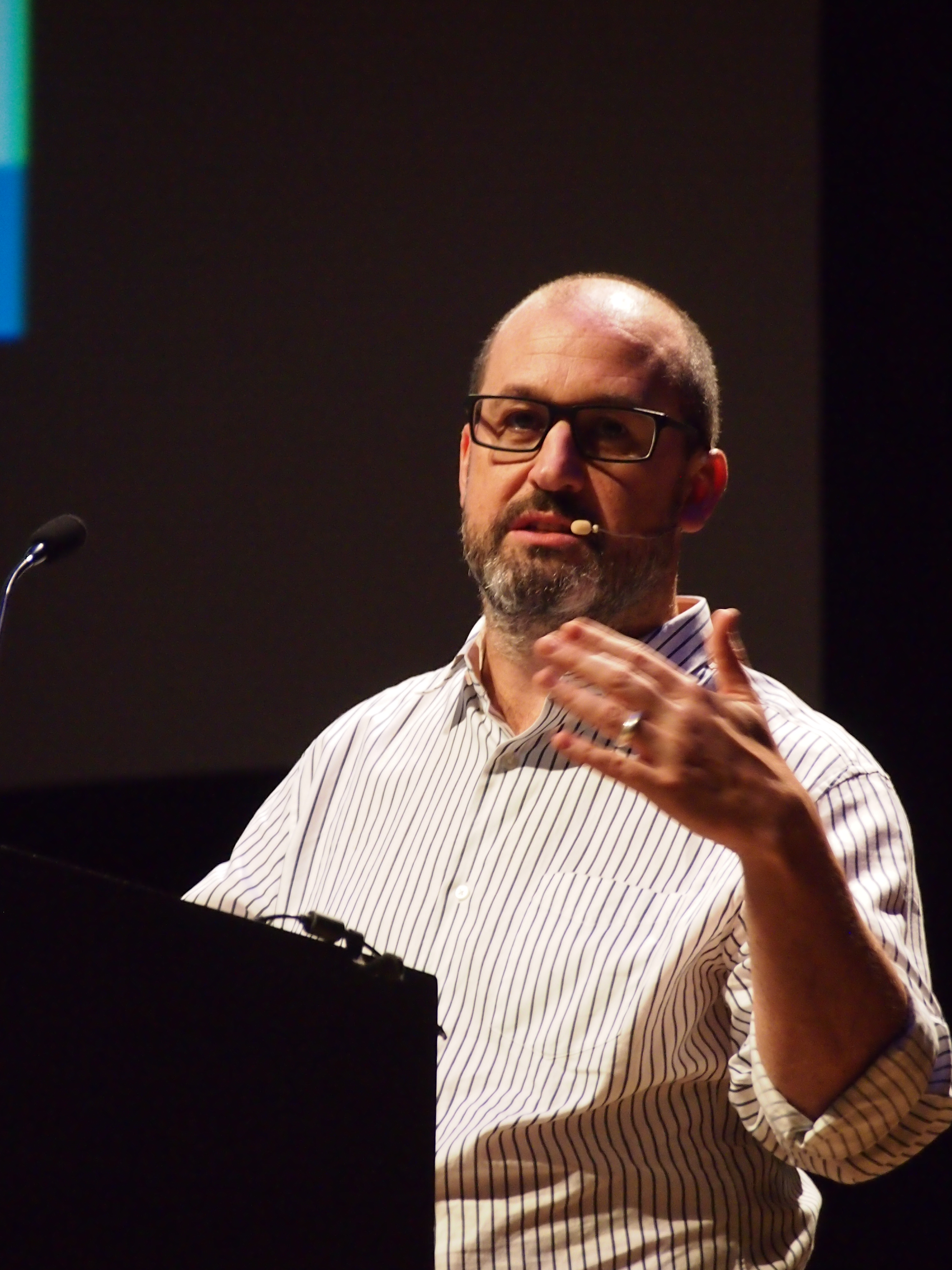
- Mike Bracken speaking at Wikimania in 2014
- Known for: Government Digital Service

Mike Bracken CBE is a public sector technology leader who was a founder and executive director of the UK Government Digital Service (GDS). Under his leadership, the UK became a world leader in digital government, with the US Digital Service, the Australian Digital Transformation Office and numerous others modelling themselves on GDS, as a founder nation of the Digital 5.

== Career ==
Bracken was director of digital development at Guardian News & Media. He was headhunted by the UK Government and joined the Government Digital Service in July 2011. He became chief data officer in 2014. He left GDS in September 2015.

From August 2015 until 2017 he was part-time chief digital officer at The Co-operative Group.

He is a visiting professor of practice at the UCL Institute for Innovation and Public Purpose.

== Bibliography ==
- Digital Transformation at Scale: Why the Strategy Is Delivery (2018, London Publishing Partnership; ISBN 978-1907994784 / 2021, London Publishing Partnership; ISBN 978-1913019396)

== See also ==
- Jerry Fishenden
- Francis Maude
- Martha Lane-Fox
- Jennifer Pahlka
- Mayank Prakash
- Ben Terrett
- Gov.uk
- GOV.UK Verify
