= GOV.UK Verify =

Identity assurance system developed by the UK Government Digital Service

GOV.UK Verify was an identity assurance system developed by the British Government Digital Service (GDS) which was in operation between May 2016 and April 2023. The system was intended to provide a single trusted login across all British government digital services, verifying the user's identity in 15 minutes. It allowed users to choose one of several companies to verify their identity to a standard level of assurance before accessing 22 central government online services.

== History ==
The Cabinet Office started work on the system in 2011, when it was known as the Identity Assurance Programme (IDAP). A private beta phase began in February 2014, moving into public beta on 14 October 2014. The system was declared live on 24 May 2016.

In June 2018, it was announced that the responsibility for digital ID policy had moved from GDS to the Department for Digital, Culture, Media & Sport. Responsibility for development and rollout of GOV.UK Verify remained with GDS.

== Certified companies ==
Third-party companies were responsible for carrying out identity verification within the scheme. The first five companies – known as identity providers (IdPs) – that signed up to provide the service through a tender issued by the Department for Work and Pensions were the Post Office, Verizon, Experian, Digidentity and Mydex CIC. After a further tender issued by the Cabinet Office in 2014, Barclays, GB Group, Morpho and Royal Mail became certified companies.

While Mydex CIC participated in the original tender process, it did not go on to become a certified GOV.UK identity provider. In 2016, Verizon was temporarily and then permanently removed from the list of certified providers.

In October 2018, GDS announced that five of the seven identity providers – Barclays, Digidentity, Experian, Post Office and SecureIdentity – had signed contracts for a further 18 months. Users of Citizensafe from GB Group and Royal Mail's identity service would be able to continue using their GOV.UK Verify identity for twelve months, but would need to set up a new account through one of the other five companies. On 24 March 2020, Barclays stopped providing new GOV.UK verify digital identities, and both SecureIdentity and Experian subsequently also pulled out of providing identities for both new and existing customers. This left only two providers: Post Office and Digidentity. The Post Office depended on Digidentity infrastructure to operate as an identity provider.

== Level of assurance ==
GOV.UK Verify certified companies had to verify customers' identities to level 2 as defined by the Good Practice Guide 45 published jointly by CESG and the Cabinet Office. This level of identity assurance is intended to be sufficient to support a claim in a civil court.

== List of connected services ==
The following 22 services were connected to GOV.UK Verify as of January 2020:

Service	Service provider
Total Reward Statements / Manage your NHS Pension	NHS Business Services Authority
Get your State Pension	Department for Work and Pensions
Sign your mortgage deed	HM Land Registry
Disclosure and barring service	Home Office
Vehicle Operator Licensing	Driver & Vehicle Standards Agency
Personal tax account	HM Revenue & Customs
Check your income tax	HM Revenue & Customs
Renew your short term medical driving licence	Driver & Vehicle Licensing Agency
Report a medical condition that affects your driving	Driver & Vehicle Licensing Agency
Check your state pension	Department for Work and Pensions, HM Revenue & Customs
Universal Credit Digital Service	Department for Work and Pensions
Help your friends or family with their tax	HM Revenue & Customs
Claim a tax refund	HM Revenue & Customs
Self Assessment tax return	HM Revenue & Customs
Claim for redundancy payment	Insolvency Service
View or share your driving licence information	Driver & Vehicle Licensing Agency
Rural Payments	Department for Environment, Food & Rural Affairs
PAYE for employees: Company car	HM Revenue & Customs
Social Work England Identity	Department for Education
Teacher Student Loan Reimbursement Scheme	Department for Education
Add a driving licence check code to your mobile phone	Driver & Vehicle Licensing Agency
Defence Cyber Protection Partnership	Ministry of Defence

By October 2022, only five of those services were still using Verify:

Sign your mortgage deed	HM Land Registry
Disclosure and barring service	Home Office
Vehicle Operator Licensing	Driver & Vehicle Standards Agency
Rural Payments	Department for Environment, Food and Rural Affairs
Add driving licence check code to your mobile phone	Driver & Vehicle Licensing Agency

== Use beyond central government ==
=== Local government ===
GDS worked with local authorities from 2015 to pilot the use of GOV.UK Verify by local government. Local government services piloted as of July 2017 included applying for free bus passes and 'blue badge' disabled parking permits.

=== Private sector ===
From the outset, GDS had intended the use of GOV.UK Verify to be extended to the private sector. While work was underway in 2017, this was still not in place in October 2018 when the GDS head Kevin Cunnington announced that "GOV.UK Verify is now mature enough for us to take it to the next stage – opening it up beyond the public sector for the private sector to take the lead".

Cunnington announced that five of the identity providers had signed contracts for a further 18 months, after which the scheme would not receive further funding from government. The development of the scheme would instead be in the hands of the private sector.

=== NHS ===
GOV.UK Verify was one of the options considered by the National Health Service for its citizen identity solution. In November 2018, the NHS announced that it was pursuing its own app-based solution, but was looking for a way to enable people who have a GOV.UK Verify account to use it to log in to NHS systems.

== International ==
Work was underway to enable non-British citizens to access the service from September 2018.

GOV.UK Verify was designed to allow interoperability with the ID schemes of other EU states, as part of the eIDAS scheme. On 28 August 2018, GOV.UK Verify took its first step towards enabling British residents to use their GOV.UK Verify account to log on to online public services in other EU countries. The scheme was 'notified' on 2 May 2019.

== Criticism ==
GOV.UK Verify did not meet various targets that GDS set for it:

- The platform was originally due to launch in 2012, but did not do so until 2016.
- The success rate in verifying individuals was 47% as of October 2018.

It does not meet all the identity requirements of government departments, such as identifying intermediaries or businesses.

The Infrastructure and Projects Authority (IPA) reviewed Verify in July 2018, noting the department's reluctance to continue funding the project, with another report later that year recommending that the identity assurance programme should be terminated.

In October 2018, Jo Platt, the Shadow Minister for the Cabinet Office, said that £130 million had been spent on developing GOV.UK Verify.

== Evolution and closure ==
In December 2018, GDS announced that over the next 18 months they would be working with standards bodies, identity providers and the private sector to:

- Make the standards easier to follow and use
- Accept more types of identity evidence
- Remove barriers to reuse of digital identities across the public and private sector
- Make better use of government data to help people prove who they are online
- Open up the market based on a standards-based approach

Computer Weekly expressed concern over this approach in August 2019.

In April 2020, funding for GOV.UK Verify was extended by 18 months due to the COVID-19 pandemic. In August 2020, trade association TechUK criticised the Government's progress since 2019 as being slow and opaque. In April 2021, the platform was extended by a further two years.

HMRC ceased to use Verify, which had been available for a limited number of online services in parallel with Government Gateway sign-in, with effect from April 2022.

On 28 October 2022, it was announced that Verify would be closed, with no new accounts created from mid-December 2022 and all Verify services closed in April 2023.

=== Replacement ===
The Government Digital Service developed a replacement service under the name One Login For Government which now operates as GOV.UK One Login.

== See also ==
- Digital identity
- Electronic authentication
- Federated identity
- Government Gateway
- Identity management
- National Strategy for Trusted Identities in Cyberspace (US equivalent initiative)
- Open Identity Exchange
