= Government Gateway =

UK government website

- Website type: Government web site
- Available in: English and Welsh
- Owner: UK Government
- Website: gateway.gov.uk (no longer available)
- Commercial: No
- Launched: 25 January 2001
- Current status: Active

The Government Gateway is an IT system developed to allow applicants to register for online services provided by the UK Government, such as obtaining a driving licence and HMRC self-assessment. This replaced the old system of paper submissions.

The system was set up by the Office of the e-Envoy and allows users to register as either an individual, an organisation or an agent. Its security credentials are accredited by CESG (formerly Communications-Electronics Security Group) within GCHQ.

The Government Gateway became widely used for HM Revenue & Customs (HMRC) online services, including self-assessment tax returns, PAYE, VAT, and corporation tax, as well as for other functions such as student finance applications, driving licence renewals, and pension checks. Over time, the system was regarded as outdated and difficult to maintain, leading the UK government to begin a phased transition to GOV.UK One Login, a unified authentication platform intended to replace multiple sign-in methods across government services by the end of the decade.

Since the end of 2024 the Government Gateway is being replaced by GOV.UK One Login.

== History ==
Government Gateway was launched on 25 January 2001, initially being used by services from HM Customs and Excise and for applications through the Ministry of Agriculture, Fisheries, and Food for common agricultural policy aid schemes, in addition to Inland Revenue end-of-year transactions.

Procurement of the service was commenced with an Official Journal of the European Union contract notice published in October 2005, following which a contract for the design, development and operation of the service was to Atos Origin in September 2006. After supplier shortlisting, Atos Origin were the only company who maintained their interest in supplying the system: other companies who had been invited to negotiate withdrew their bids early in 2006.

Services on the Government Gateway were meant to be gradually moved to replacement systems, including GOV.UK Verify. The move was meant to be complete by March 2019.

Following reports of conflict between HMRC and the Government Digital Service (GDS), HMRC has been developing its own service which allows users to sign in using an existing Government Gateway user ID.

HMRC commenced the phased migration from Government Gateway to GOV.UK One Login in 2023, with plans to onboard new individual customers lacking Government Gateway credentials first, followed by existing individual customers starting in late 2026 to 2027.

== Successor ==
Since the end of 2024 the Government Gateway is gradually being replaced by GOV.UK One Login.

== See also ==
- Gov.uk
