= Ukonline =

Defunct web portal of the UK government

- Founded: 2001
- Dissolved: 2004
- Website: ukonline.gov.uk
- Current status: Defunct

Ukonline was a "portal" website of the Government of the United Kingdom linking to public sector information, and was originally called me.gov. The site was launched in 2001 and maintained by the Office of the e-Envoy (later the e-Government Unit, part of the Cabinet Office). It replaced the earlier single online government website, the Government Information Service (GIS) hosted at open.gov.uk, which had been established in November 1994. The need for an updated single government website had been identified in a 1999 Portal Feasibility Study prepared by PA Consulting for the Central IT Unit (CITU) in the Cabinet Office.

The site featured news, links, and search facilities connecting together much of the government's web presence, though later this pan-government search facility was removed. Visitors to the site were able to search for information on a variety of topics (for example, agriculture, finance and health) and retrieve a list of government departments that were able to provide them with more information. It was also possible to do such things as apply for a passport, buy a television licence, register to vote or complete and send a Tax Self Assessment form, but only if users left the website, as they could not actually perform the transaction on UKonline.

The site was replaced in 2004 by the service Directgov, which was then replaced in 2012 by the service Gov.uk.
