= ClarityCheck =

Internet background check company

- Type: Private
- Industry: Background screening, identity verification
- Area served: Worldwide
- Website: claritycheck.com

ClarityCheck is a web-based background check and identity verification site designed to help people locate information about individuals from publicly available sources. The platform combines all the data found in public records, social networking sites, and other public sources in one report.

The company has faced widespread criticism and scam allegations regarding deceptive subscription models and unauthorized billing.

== History ==
Founded in the early 2020s, ClarityCheck was created to make public-record searches more accessible to consumers. In 2025, the company announced that it had processed more than 25 million searches. Its growth has been linked to increasing concerns about online scams, fake identities, and digital safety.

Users can search by name, phone number, email address, or other identifiers to access publicly available information, which may include address history, social media accounts, and, where legally available, criminal records. The platform is intended for personal use and is not a consumer reporting agency under the Fair Credit Reporting Act (FCRA).

Independent security researcher Jeremiah Fowler found that a ClarityCheck image database containing over 9 million images was stored in an unsecured Amazon S3 bucket which could be accessed by anyone online. The vulnerability was exposed for several months and was remediated in July 2026.

== Subscription ==
ClarityCheck offers an initial trial period for new users. According to the company's terms of service, users who do not cancel before the end of the trial are automatically enrolled in a recurring monthly subscription.

== Reception ==
ClarityCheck has been discussed in media coverage of online dating and digital trust. Vice examined how verification tools are changing modern relationships, while Newsweek and the BBC cited the platform in reporting on identity verification and online safety. Supporters argue that such services help users verify identities before interacting online, whereas critics have raised concerns about privacy, consent, and the normalisation of background checks in everyday life.
