= Acuant =

Technology services company

- Type: Private
- Industry: Identity verification service
- Founded: 1999
- Founders: Danny and Iuval Hatzav
- Defunct: 2021
- Fate: Acquired
- Successor: GB Group plc
- Headquarters: Los Angeles, Calif., United States
- Key people: Yossi Zekri (President & CEO), Stephen Maloney (EVP, Chief Revenue Officer)
- Services: Multi-channel ID document authentication Fraud prevention
- Website: www.acuant.com

Acuant was an American identity verification, document authentication and fraud prevention technology services provider headquartered in Los Angeles. It had engineering and development centers in New Hampshire and Israel. The company was acquired by British GB Group plc (GBG) in 2021 and services were integrated into GBGs offerings.

Products included ID capture and auto-fill software, ID authentication, biometric facial recognition, facial image matching, and CHIP/RFID reading. The company's customers include start-ups, Fortune 500 and FTSE 350 organizations.

Acuant's applications addressed regulations such as AML, KYC, and PII, and were used by organizations in such industries as hospitality, healthcare, automotive, security, and financial services.

== History ==
Acuant was founded by Danny and Iuval Hatzav, as Card Scanning Solutions, in Los Angeles, California, in 1999.

In May 2016, Acuant acquired Assure-Tec Technologies, a provider of identity document authentication and data capture solutions.

In 2017, Acuant acquired Ozone from Mount Airy Group.

In 2018, Audax Private Equity completed an investment in Acuant to support the continued growth initiatives of the company. Audax acquired a controlling interest in Acuant from Insight Venture Partners, Lightview Capital and Egis Capital Partners.

In 2020, Acuant announced the acquisition of the former strategic partner IdentityMind, creator of Trusted Digital Identities.

On November 18, 2021, UK-based GB Group plc announced it was acquiring Acuant for $736 million (£547 million).

== See also ==
- Multi-factor authentication
- Automatic identification and data capture
