= Mayank =

Mayank is a masculine given name found in India, meaning "shining moon".

== Notable people ==
- Mayank Agarwal (born 1991), Indian cricketer
- Mayank Anand, Indian actor
- Mayank Austen Soofi, Indian writer
- Mayank Dagar (born 1996), Indian cricketer
- Mayank Gandhi (born 1958), Indian social activist
- Mayank Markande (born 1997), Indian cricketer
- Mayank Mishra (born 1990), Indian cricketer
- Mayank Prakash (born 1973), British business leader
- Mayank Raghav (born 1988), Indian cricketer
- Mayank Shekhar, Indian film critic
- Mayank Sidhana (born 1986), Indian cricketer
- Mayank Tehlan (born 1986), Indian cricketer
