= Delivery unit =

Delivery unit may refer to:

- a hospital labour ward for childbirth
- Prime Minister's Delivery Unit, a British government organisation
