= Directgov =

Former British government website

- Screenshot
- Website type: Government information
- Available in: English and Welsh
- Owner: HM Government
- Creator: UK government departments
- Website: direct.gov.uk (archive)
- Commercial: No
- Registration: No
- Launched: 1 April 2004; 22 years ago
- Current status: Offline 17 October 2012; 13 years ago
- Content license: Crown copyright See copyright page for licencing information.

Directgov was the British government's digital service portal which from 2004 provided a single point of access to public sector information and services. The site's portal was replaced (along with the Business Link portal) by the new GOV.UK website on 17 October 2012, although migration of all services to GOV.UK branding took several years.

The content was developed by government departments, working with a central Directgov team. The main outlet was the website, though content and services were also delivered via mobile.

Directgov received more than fifteen million visits a month in 2008, from around eight million unique users. In September 2007, the site received its one hundred millionth visitor since its launch in April 2004.

== History ==
=== Launch ===
Directgov was launched in April 2004, replacing the Ukonline portal. Rather than just providing links to government departments as UKonline had done, Directgov carried its own material, designed around users' needs. The first three sections were for motorists, disabled people and parents.

By 2006 the site had over ten million visits per month, and involved 18 government departments.

=== Departmental responsibility ===
In April 2006, Directgov moved from the e-Government Unit (eGU) within the Cabinet Office to become part of the Central Office of Information (COI), an executive agency of the Cabinet Office.

As part of the Transformational Government strategy, an annual report was published in January 2007 stating that hundreds of government websites would be shut down "to make access to information easier" for people. In future, most government information would be streamlined through two main "supersites" – either Directgov (for citizens) or Businesslink.gov.uk (for businesses). It was reported at the launch of the strategy that of 951 websites, only 26 would definitely stay, 551 would definitely close and hundreds more were expected to follow. About £9 million a year was expected to be saved over three years by cutting back on sites that did not serve a useful purpose.

On 1 April 2008, Directgov moved again, from the COI to the Department for Work and Pensions (DWP), in a machinery of government change.

By the end of the fourth quarter of 2009 Directgov reported traffic statistics of circa 20 million hits a month from over 8 million unique users.

A national TV and radio advertising campaign was launched in January 2010 featuring a number of celebrities including Suggs, Honor Blackman and Kelly Brook.

On 20 July 2010, Directgov was moved back to the Cabinet Office from the Department for Work and Pensions. On 1 April 2011 Directgov became part of the Government Digital Service, overseen by the Public Expenditure Executive (Efficiency & Reform) which was co-chaired by Minister for the Cabinet Office, Francis Maude and the Chief Secretary to the Treasury, Danny Alexander.

=== Replacement ===
On 13 September 2012, through a notice on the Directgov homepage, it was announced that the GOV.UK project, built by the Government Digital Service, would replace Directgov as the primary website of the UK government on 17 October 2012. The Directgov portal was closed and redirected to the new website from that date. Services provided by Directgov were not fully replaced for a number of years: for example, in 2018 the Universal Jobmatch service and the blue badge application form were still provided from direct.gov.uk webpages.

== Services ==
The website was primarily an information resource, providing users with officially written advice and information targeted to specific topics (e.g. motoring, money) and audiences (e.g. disabled people, parents). It also provided directories of government departments, agencies and local councils. There was also a Welsh language version of the site.

=== Document applications ===
Over time, access to online government transactions and public services was added to the site. The site linked to a number of online transactions and forms such as applying for a passport, buying a television licence, car licensing, registering to vote, and completing a Self Assessment tax return.

=== Local services ===
From 2006, users in England were able to find out about a wide range of services provided by local councils in their area, from reporting illegally dumped rubbish to renewing a library book. Direct links to each type of service were collected from every local authority through the Local Directgov programme.

=== Budget documents ===
In a strategic partnership with HM Treasury and the BBC, Directgov hosted the Budget Day documents in March 2010 and June 2010. On Budget Day Directgov also provided real time updates from the Chancellor's speech on Twitter with the account @Directgov and using a custom Twitter widget. This strategic partnership was extended to cover the Comprehensive Spending Review on 20 October 2010.

Directgov ceased hosting documents for the Budget from 23 March 2011, with HM Treasury becoming the sole government host. Directgov focused instead on providing information for the public on how the Budget could affect them.

=== Alternative versions ===
A separate website branded as DirectgovKids was designed to help children aged 5 to 11 find out about the world around them, by exploring the places and people in their local community. The Flash animated site was based around a cartoon globe, with interactive buildings including a police station, a town hall and a school.

A version of Directgov for mobile phones was available by typing direct.gov.uk/mobile into the phone's browser.

Directgov was also available through analogue teletext pages as well as digital interactive television on Freeview channel 106 until 1 July 2010, Sky until 22 December 2010 and Virgin Media until 31 March 2011.

Directgov also provided a service that covered country-wide customised maps for blue badge holders, In addition to council policies, this service also would pinpoint the location of features specific to the disabled community.

=== Social media and article comments ===
Directgov was active on Twitter, Facebook and YouTube.

In April 2010 Directgov launched a "Comment on this Article" feature on each page allowing users to give articles one of five ratings ranging from "Very useful" to "Not at all useful". Users could also leave comments of up to 500 characters about how a page could be improved, but were asked not to include any personally identifiable information. Directgov collected the data from the comments feature for use in customer insight and product improvement, and published an overview of monthly ratings online.

== Criticism ==
In 2005, several internet activists affiliated with mySociety wrote Directionlessgov.com to demonstrate that they could build something better in under an hour, by using a simple web page that linked to the Google search engine. Directionlessgov was later upgraded to compare the results of Directgov's own search engine with the Google results side by side. In discussion, one of the authors wrote:

To me the [point we are] making is not that direct.gov should be licensing Google's search... it is that direct.gov should not exist at all - in practice everybody types what they want to do into Google. With the budget saved... instead optimise text and titles on government websites i.e. do some Search Engine Optimisation. Run user tests to find the terms that people search for when wanting to do things that government can help them with. Arrange that Google, Yahoo! and MSN searches for those terms take them to the correct site.

In an interview with The Guardian newspaper in August 2007, the Chief Executive of Directgov, Jayne Nickalls, responded:

Directionless does work a lot of the time. But it misses the point that Directgov joins up information for the citizen in a way that they understand. If you do a Google search you will get the information from a number of places and the citizen has to do the linking up for themself.
