= GB Group =

GB Group can mean:

- GB Group (conglomerate), a diversified business conglomerate based in Port-au-Prince, Haiti
- GB Group plc, an identity management, location intelligence and fraud prevention company
- GB Group, the parent company of Stockport-based contractor and developer GB Building Solutions
- GB Group, a supermarket chain owned by GIB Group
- GB Foods, a Barcelona-based food and beverages company with operations across Europe and Africa, owned by Agrolimen
