= GOV.UK One Login =

UK government website

GOV.UK One Login is a UK government digital identity service designed to provide a unified authentication platform for all government services. It is administered by the Government Digital Service within the Department for Science, Innovation and Technology.

GOV.UK One Login works through internet browsers and an app.

It replaced the earlier systems GOV.UK Verify that closed in April 2023 and Government Gateway that is being withdrawn from 2024 onwards.

== Aims ==
Users can register online to establish their identity and can then access many government online services using one common login with the aim of replacing multiple sign-in methods across government services by 2030.

Some services such as HMRC are phasing in GOV.UK One Login for users with existing Government Gateway credentials.

A list of services on the system is available.

== See also ==
- Gov.uk
