= Government Identity System (United Kingdom) =

Standard for British government agencies

The Government Identity System is maintained by His Majesty's Government to present unified branding format for the logos of government ministries, agencies and arm's length bodies. The format was introduced in 2012 alongside a revamp of gov.uk to provide a clearer brand for all government work.

The consistent element of the Government identity is the Royal Coat of Arms, with the text name of the organisation below it, and a vertical line of colour to the left.

Exemptions to the use of the Royal Coat of Arms may be permitted when an organisation has its own arms, insignia, or symbol. These include:

- HM Coast Guard
- HM Revenue & Customs
- Home Office and associated agencies
- Department for International Trade
- Government Communications Headquarters
- Ministry of Defence and associated agencies
- Scotland Office
- Secret Intelligence Service
- Security Service
- UK Hydrographic Office
- UK Atomic Energy Authority
- Wales Office
