= Paravision (identity verification service) =

Identity verification technology company

- Company type: Private
- Industry: Software
- Services: Identity verification service
- Website: www.paravision.ai

Paravision is a technology company which provides a backend identity verification service as a business-to-business product for other, consumer-facing organizations which verify the legal identities of Internet users.

== History ==
In 2021 after the Federal Trade Commission accused the company of unlawful use of consumer data including deception about retaining consumer uploaded ID photos for additional use, retaining data of users who deactivated their accounts, and use of this data for purposes beyond verifying user identity. Through this time and before, the company used names including "Ever", "Ever AI", "Everalbum", and then became Paravision by 2021.

In 2021 the company raised US$21 million in capital from investors including J2 Ventures, HID Global, Marlinspike Capital, Atomic VC, Icon Ventures, Perot Jain and Red Cell Partners.

== Services ==
In 2024 Paravision began a major research collaboration with the intergovernmental intelligence organization Five Eyes.

Paravision is the business-to-business technology backend providing identity verification to consumer-facing services including Persona.
