= Center of government =

Institutions providing direct support to chief executive

The center of government (CoG) is the institution or group of institutions that provide direct support to the chief executive (president or prime minister) in leading the management of government. Unlike line ministries and other government agencies, the CoG does not deliver services directly to the citizens, and it does not focus on a specific policy area. On the contrary, the CoG performs cross-government functions. A similar concept is "Core Executive".

== Definition ==
Two types of CoG definition exist: by structure or by function.

In the first type, the defining criterion is the position in the structure of the Executive branch. It only includes institutions and units that directly and exclusively support the head of the government. For example, it refers to Ministries or General-Secretariats of the Presidency, Offices of the President or Prime Minister, and Cabinet Offices.

In the functional definitions, the defining criterion is that the institution performs whole-of-government functions, especially in terms of planning, coordination, monitoring, political management, and communications. Therefore, in addition to the previously mentioned institutions (such as Ministries of the Presidency), other institutions performing these tasks are also included, even if they are not part of the structure of the Presidency. For example, Ministries or Offices of Planning, Delivery Units, Inter-Ministerial Committees, and even Budget Offices are considered part of the CoG.

A number of authors favor functional definitions, for considering them more applicable to countries with different forms of government and institutional frameworks.

== Relevance ==
Chief Executives (Presidents and Prime Ministers) have had supporting institutions for a long time. In the United Kingdom, the Cabinet Office dates to 1916, when the war demanded a stronger central coordination for the government. In the United States, the Executive Office of the President was established in 1939, after the Brownlow Committee stated that "the President needs help." Offices, Ministries or General Secretariats of the Presidency have also existed in Latin American for several decades now.

However, a number of factors lead to a greater importance of the CoG. The following factors have been highlighted: the cross-cutting nature of several current public problems, the need to lead with a unified orientation governments that have decentralized authority to autonomous agencies, and the growing interesting for achieving results for the citizens, beyond a purely fiscal coordination. These factors explain the interest that several governments and international organizations have on the topic, including projects by the Organisation for Cooperation and Economic Development and the Inter-American Development Bank.

Moreover, new institutional developments have generated increased interest in the CoG. The Prime Minister's Delivery Unit in the United Kingdom was established to ensure that the government's priorities were being implemented, through an intensive monitoring by the CoG. Several countries have replicated this model, including Malaysia and Chile. Paraguay has established a "Center of Government" within the General-Secretariat of the Presidency, in charge of coordinating and monitoring the government action.

== The center of government in different countries ==
In OECD countries, the CoG institutions lead the functions of coordinating the preparation of Cabinet meetings, coordinating the formulation and implementation of policy, monitoring delivery, strategic planning for the whole-of-government, and communicating the government's messages. Regarding the characteristics of the CoG, there are important variations in terms of organization and staff. For example, in countries like the United Kingdom and Sweden most of the CoG staff belongs to the civil service, while in Canada, Australia and New Zealand political appointees have a larger presence. Important variations have also been identified in Latin America, not only in terms of organization but also in the capacity of CoGs to perform their functions: while some countries have more developed CoGs, others present more serious weaknesses. This heterogeneity across countries has also been detected in the Middle East and North Africa region.

== See also ==
- OECD Network of Senior Officials from Centres of Government
- Website of the Center of Government Project of the Inter-American Development Bank
