= New Aesthetic =

Artistic movement exploring the intersection of the digital and physical worlds

The New Aesthetic is a term coined by British art critic James Bridle, used to refer to the increasing convergence of digital technology and the Internet with consensus reality, and the blending of the virtual and the physical. Bridle articulated the notion through a series of talks and observations, gaining wider attention following a panel at the SXSW conference in 2012.

== History ==
Developing from a series of collections of digital objects that have become located in the physical, the movement circulates around a blog named "The New Aesthetic" which has defined the broad contours of the movement without a manifesto. The New Aesthetic as a concept was introduced at South By South West (SXSW) on March 12, 2012, at a panel organized by James Bridle and included Aaron Cope, Ben Terrett, Joanne McNeil and Russell Davies.

An article by Bruce Sterling in Wired Magazine propelled the ideas around the New Aesthetic into critical and public consciousness. Sterling's article proposed some key critical areas for development. The subsequent response from was rapid and engaged with a number of significant contemporaneous contributions.

The author Bruce Sterling has said of the New Aesthetic:

The “New Aesthetic” is a native product of modern network culture. It’s from London, but it was born digital, on the Internet. The New Aesthetic is a “theory object” and a “shareable concept.”
"The New Aesthetic is “collectively intelligent.” It’s diffuse, crowd-sourcey, and made of many small pieces loosely joined. It is rhizomatic, as the people at Rhizome would likely tell you. It’s open-sourced, and triumph-of-amateurs. It’s like its logo, a bright cluster of balloons tied to some huge, dark and lethal weight."

Matthew Battles, a contributor to Metalab, a project of the Berkman Center for Internet and Society, gives a definition that makes reference to purported paradigmatic examples:

"New Aesthetic is a collaborative attempt to draw a circle around several species of aesthetic activity—including but not limited to drone photography, ubiquitous surveillance, glitch imagery, Streetview photography, 8-bit net nostalgia. Central to the New Aesthetic is a sense that we’re learning to “wave at machines”—and that perhaps in their glitchy, buzzy, algorithmic ways, they’re beginning to wave back in earnest."

One of the more substantive contributions to the notion of the New Aesthetic has been through a development of, and linking to, the way in which the digital and the everyday are increasingly interpenetrating each other. Here, the notion of the irrepresentability of computation, as both an infrastructure and an ecology, are significant in understanding the common New Aesthetic tendency towards pixelated graphics and a retro 8-bit form. This is related to the idea of an episteme (or ontotheology) identified with relation to computation and computational ways of seeing and doing: computationality.

Michael Betancourt has discussed the New Aesthetic in relation to digital automation. The ‘new aesthetic’ provides a reference point for the examination of Karl Marx's discussion of machines in ‘The Fragment on Machines.’

"The 'new aesthetic' documents is the shift from earlier considerations of machine labor as an amplifier and extension of human action -- as an augmentation of human labor -- to its replacement by models where the machine does not augment but supplant, in the process apparently removing the human intermediary that is the labor that historically lies between the work of human designer-engineers and fabrication following their plans."

According to Betancourt, the New Aesthetic documents a shift in production that is different than that described by Marx. Where the machines Marx described were dependent on human control, those identified with the New Aesthetic work to supplant the human element, replacing it with digital automation, effectively removing living labor from the production process.
