= Prime Minister's Strategy Unit =

Unit of the UK Cabinet Office

The Prime Minister's Strategy Unit (often referred to simply as The Strategy Unit) was a unit based in the UK Cabinet Office between 2002 and 2010 (with its predecessor unit, the Performance and Innovation Unit, dating back to 1999). The Strategy Unit was established by the former Prime Minister Tony Blair, forming one part of a more streamlined centre of government along with a Delivery Unit (headed by Sir Michael Barber, focused on the delivery of public service targets), a Policy Unit (whose heads included David Miliband and Andrew Adonis, providing day-to-day policy advice) and a Communications Unit (headed by Alastair Campbell and later David Hill).

The Strategy Unit operated during the premiership of Prime Ministers Tony Blair and Gordon Brown until its functions were transferred to other units in the Cabinet Office of Prime Minister David Cameron in November 2010

The purpose of the Strategy Unit was to provide the UK Prime Minister with in-depth strategy advice and policy analysis on key priorities. According to Tony Blair the Strategy Unit would "look ahead at the way policy would develop, the fresh challenges and new ideas to meet them". In this respect it had many similar responsibilities to the Central Policy Review Staff which served successive governments between 1973 and 1982, though its methods were different, often involving much more detailed involvement in planning and legislation, with many of its projects taken through Cabinet for decision rather than being only advisory.

It had three primary roles:

- carrying out strategy reviews and providing policy advice in accordance with the Prime Minister's policy priorities
- supporting government departments in developing effective strategies and policies, and helping them build their strategic capability
- conducting occasional strategic audits, and identifying key challenges for the UK Government

Over its history the Strategy Unit varied in size, averaging around forty-five staff but at one point reached 150. Competition to work in the Strategy Unit was fierce and the unit traditionally drew in high flyers from academia, the city, top consultancy firms and think tanks and from the Senior Civil Service. Throughout its history the Strategy Unit worked closely with the No.10 Policy Unit who often commissioned the topics of its strategy reviews. From 2003-4 both were run by Geoff Mulgan. The Unit produced many significant reports which set and drove the direction of the Blair and Brown Governments. Prominent among these were:

- Public service reform papers, including the Education Strategy Review, several major reforms to open up public services to more choice and personalisation such as the Schools Reform White Paper (which extended school choice to parents) and the Health Care Reform Paper, and strategic direction setting for the overall public service reform programme for example with the UK Government's Approach to Public Service Reform and the Policy Review of Public Services
- Many policy innovations, ranging from the energy reviews which led to a big expansion of renewables and offshore wind, and some of the first strategies around carbon reduction; the criminal assets recovery policy; strategies on e-government and e-commerce; promoting recycling; reforming charity law and creating the new legal category of 'Community Interest Company'; and the 'joined-up' approach to foreign policy linking FCO, DfID and MoD. Other ideas were either rejected (such as the proposal for personal accounts for citizens - which was adopted in Singapore and Denmark), or implemented much later (such as taxes on sugar)
- Several major policy thinkpieces, including in the fields of behaviour change with Personal Responsibility and Behaviour Change and culture change with the report Achieving Culture Change: a Policy Framework, on social mobility and life changes authoring papers including the work of Alan Milburn's Social Mobility Commission as well as discussion papers on the topic, on life satisfaction and happiness research, and other new and emerging topics such as social capital
- Periodic 'Strategic Audits' of the UK in 2003, 2005, 2006, 2007 and 2008
- A 'Strategy Survival Guide' to support strategic thinking and evidenced-based policymaking. A book-length account of the methods used by the unit was later written by Geoff Mulgan and published by Oxford University Press.

The full archive of the over 130 publications from the Strategy Unit is hosted at the National Archives. The Strategy Unit also ran a high-profile seminar series, with speakers including Martin Wolf, Paul Krugman, Sir Gus O'Donnell, Lord Ian Blair, and Robert Putnam.

The Strategy Unit was based in the Admiralty Arch, part of the Cabinet Office's buildings in Whitehall. The directors of the Strategy Unit were:

- Geoff Mulgan, 2002-2004 (he was previously Director of the Performance and Innovation Unit, 2000-2002, which evolved into the Strategy Unit)
- Stephen Aldridge, 2004-2009
- Gareth Davies, 2009-2010

== See also ==
- Prime Minister's Office
