= E-Government Unit =

The e-Government Unit (eGU) was a unit of the Cabinet Office of the government of the United Kingdom responsible for helping various government departments use information technology to increase efficiency and improve electronic access to government services. It was therefore deeply involved in issues of e-Government.

The unit was created by Prime Minister Tony Blair in September 2004, replacing the Office of the e-Envoy. Its first head was Ian Watmore, who was succeeded in January 2006 by Andrew Stott.

The eGU website was closed down in 2007.

== History ==
The e-Government Unit (eGU) was established in September 2004 within the Cabinet Office by Prime Minister Tony Blair, replacing the Office of the e-Envoy. Its purpose was to coordinate information technology policy and support the digital transformation of public services across central government.

In January 2006, Andrew Stott succeeded Ian Watmore as head of the unit after Watmore became head of the Prime Minister's Delivery Unit.

In 2007, the eGU was reorganised into the Transformational Government programme within the Cabinet Office as responsibility for digital government evolved across Whitehall.

Many of the eGU's responsibilities were subsequently transferred to the Government Digital Service (GDS), which was established in 2011.

== Mission ==
The eGU’s stated mission was to ensure that its information technology (IT) supported the government's business transformations in order to provide better services to the public. In addition to developing IT strategies, policies, and usable components, it delivered citizen-centered online services, and was responsible for promoting the best practices across the UK government.

The eGU website listed six guiding principles for the unit:

1. To work on public service projects, not just IT projects
2. To add value and support, rather than control or dictate
3. To undertake partnerships with departments and suppliers
4. To set realistic expectations and aim to exceed them
5. To promote global best practices
6. To share solutions when possible, and offer flexibility to meet unique needs

== Legacy ==
The e-Government Unit played a significant role in developing the United Kingdom's early digital government strategy during the 2000s. Its work on shared services, interoperability, identity management, and cross-government ICT policy informed later digital transformation initiatives.

The establishment of the Government Digital Service (GDS) in 2011 built upon many of the policies, standards, and organisational lessons developed by the eGU.

== Responsibilities ==
Responsibilities of the eGU included:

- Strategy – to develop policy and planning for Information and Communication Technology (ICT) within the Government and to provide an element of programme management; to support the Government's objectives for public service delivery and administrative efficiency.
- Architecture – to provide policy, design, standards, governance, advice and guidance for ICT in central government; to commission government-wide infrastructure and services; to address issues of systems integration with other levels of government.
- Innovation – to provide high-level advice to government bodies on innovative opportunities that come from ICT.
- IT Finance – to monitor major IT projects in the Government and give advice on major investment decisions, in partnership with the Office of Government Commerce (OGC).
- IT HR – to lead the Government’s professional IT development.
- Projects – to take on ad hoc policy and strategy studies to support ministers, the Prime Minister's Office, the Cabinet Office and the Treasury.
- Research – to identify and communicate key technology trends, opportunities, threats and risks.
- Security – to oversee government IT security policy, standards, monitoring and assurance, and contingency-planning for the critical national infrastructure.
- Supplier management – to manage the top-level relationship with strategic suppliers to the Government and to carry out supplier analysis, in partnership with OGC.

== Organisation ==
The eGU formed part of the Cabinet Office and worked with government departments to develop ICT strategy, establish technical standards, oversee major IT programmes, and improve online public services. It collaborated closely with the Office of Government Commerce and departmental Chief Information Officers.

== See also ==
- Government Digital Service
- Office of the e-Envoy
- GOV.UK
- Digital government
- Cabinet Office
