= Jobcentre Plus =

Employment service in Great Britain

Executive Agency overview
- Formed: 2002; 24 years ago
- Preceding Executive Agency: Employment service
- Dissolved: 4 October 2011
- Superseding Executive Agency: Department for Work and Pensions
- Jurisdiction: Government of the United Kingdom (Great Britain only)
- Headquarters: Leeds, United Kingdom
- Minister responsible: Various incumbents, Secretary of State for Work and Pensions
- Parent department: Department for Work and Pensions
Other UK counterparts
- Northern Ireland: Jobs and Benefits Offices

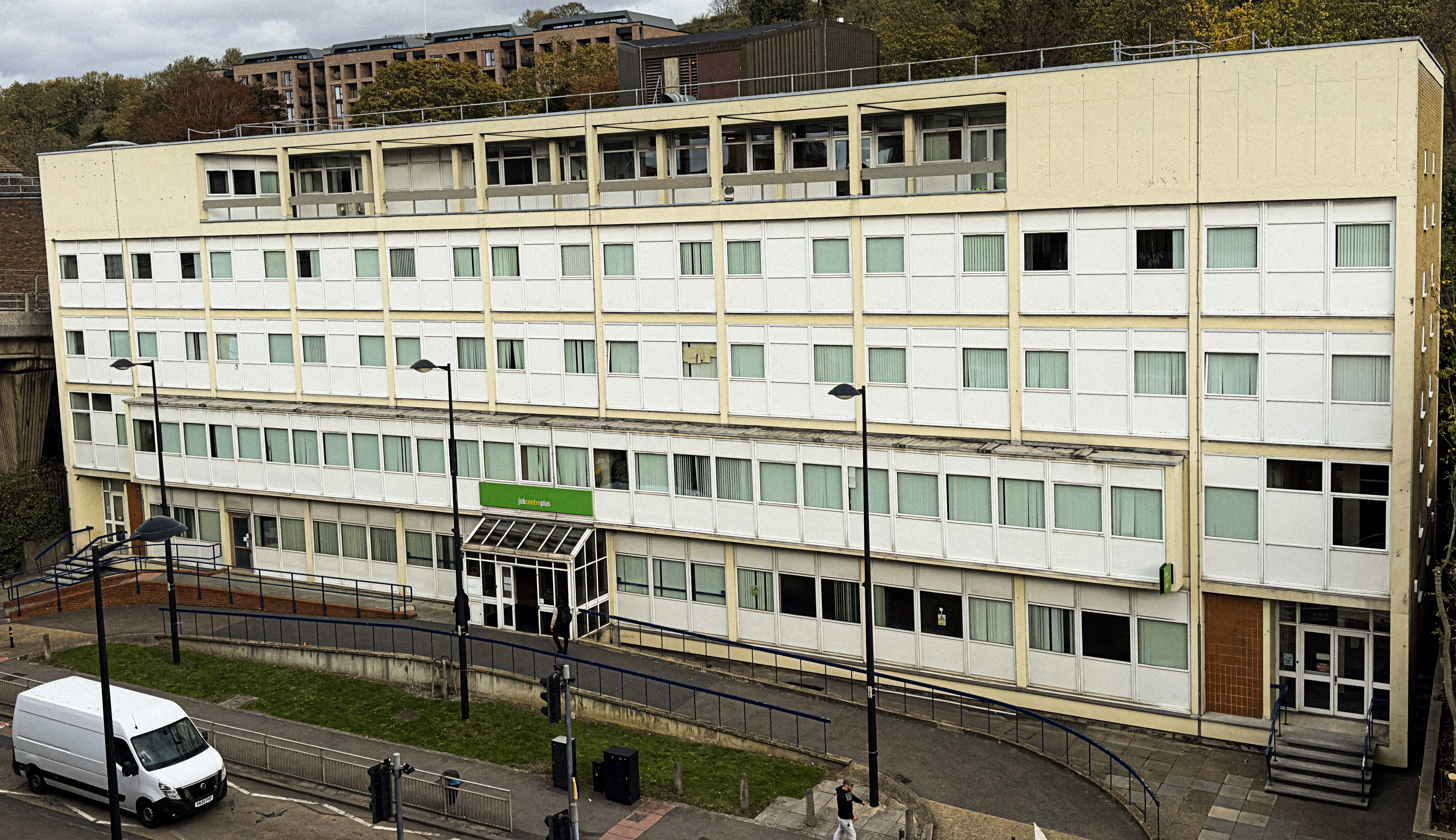
A Jobcentre Plus in Chatham, Kent, England (October 2025)

Jobcentre Plus (Welsh: Canolfan byd Gwaith; Scottish Gaelic: Ionad Obrach is Eile) is a public employment service, operating through offices across Great Britain, as a brand of the Department for Work and Pensions.

From 2002 to 2011, Jobcentre Plus was an executive agency which reported directly to the Minister of State for Employment. It was formed by the amalgamation of two agencies, the Employment Service, which operated Jobcentres, and the Benefits Agency, which ran social security offices.

Jobcentre Plus does not operate in Northern Ireland, with its counterpart being the Jobs and Benefits Offices operated by Northern Ireland's Department for Communities, which provide the same services in relation to finding employment and benefits claims relating to Universal Credit.

== Role of Jobcentre Plus ==
Jobcentre Plus was an executive agency of the Department for Work and Pensions of the government of the United Kingdom between 2002 and 2011. The functions of Jobcentre Plus were subsequently provided directly through the Department for Work and Pensions. The agency provided services primarily to those attempting to find employment and to those requiring the issuing of a financial provision due to, in the first case, lack of employment, of an allowance to assist with the living costs and expenditure intrinsic to the effort to achieve employment, or in all other cases the provision of social-security benefit as the result of a person without an income from employment due to illness-incapacity including drug addiction. The organisation acted from within the government's agenda for community and social welfare. Services were provided in the first instance via job advisers, both in-house and on the telephone. An information technology system known as the Labour Market System (LMS) contained the personal details of job seekers and advertised job vacancies for employers within each of the public offices.

Between 2012 and 2018 a government website named Universal Jobmatch was used whereby jobseekers could search for employment and employers could upload and manage their own vacancies whilst searching for prospective employees.

Jobcentre Plus has processed claims for a number of working-age benefits including Jobseeker's Allowance, Incapacity Benefit, Employment and Support Allowance and Income Support. These benefits have been mostly phased out over time and replaced by Universal Credit. Jobcentre Plus processes claims for this combined benefit.

== History ==
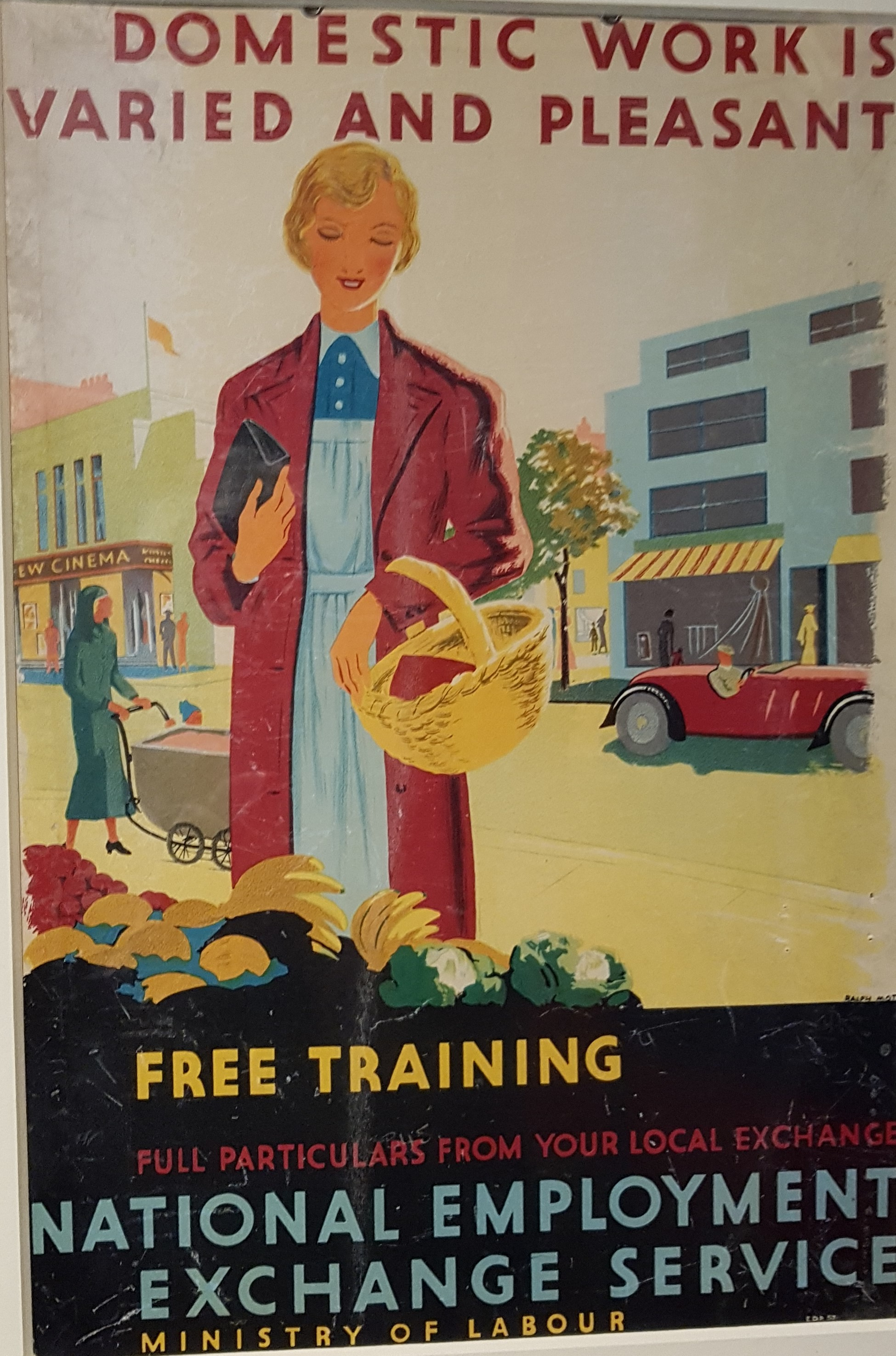
National Employment Exchange Service poster

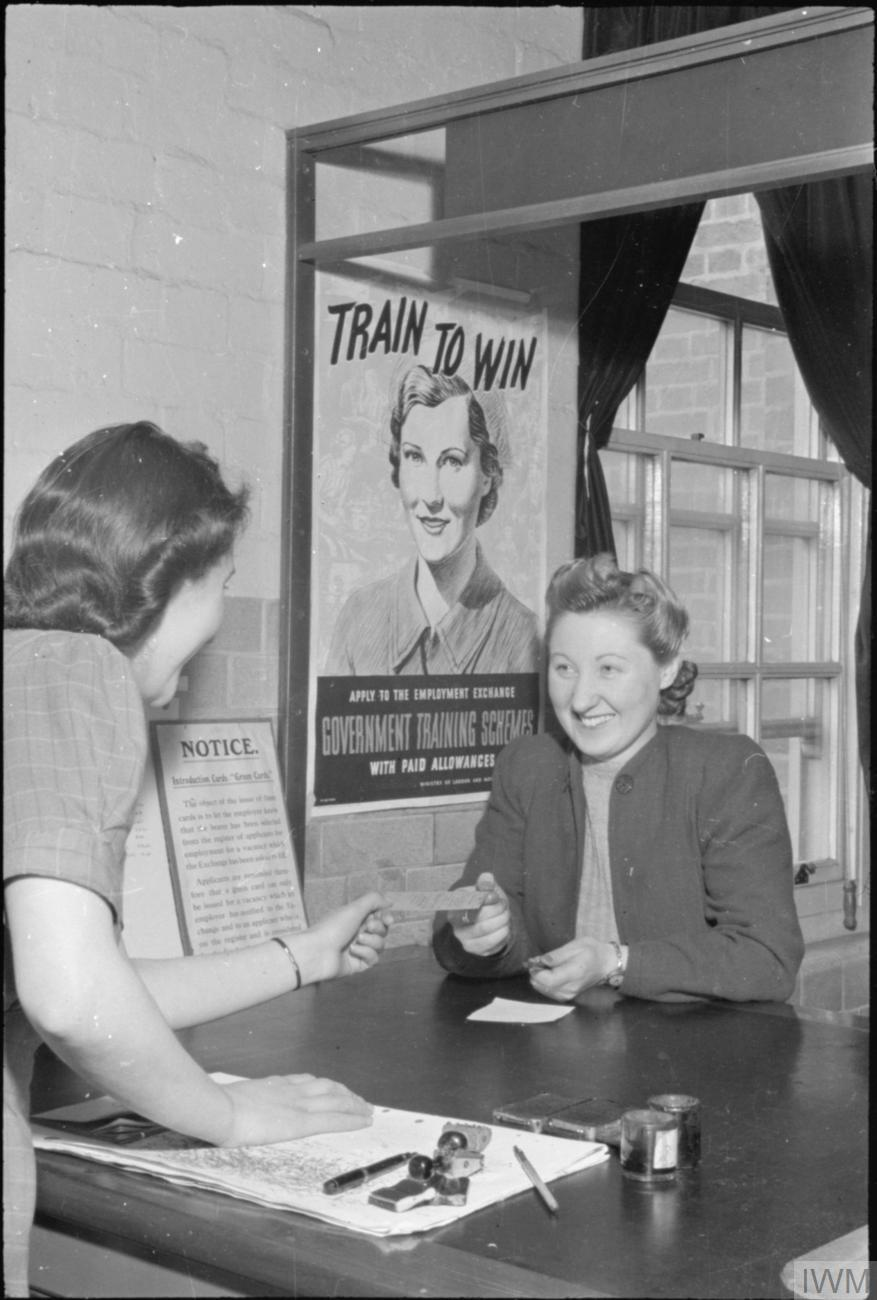
A worker signing up at an employment exchange for work in a war production factory, May 1941

The forerunners of the Jobcentre Plus were the state-run labour exchanges, originally the vision of Winston Churchill, President of the Board of Trade, and William Beveridge, who had worked for a more efficient labour system in the early years of the twentieth century. This was intended to address the chaos of the labour market and the problems of casual employment.

In 1908, Beveridge was commissioned to devise a scheme which would combine labour exchanges with a new government-funded unemployment benefit. The Labour Exchanges Act 1909 was rushed through Parliament and was passed in September 1909 and, after months of planning and recruitment of clerks; 62 labour exchanges were opened on 1 February 1910. The number of offices rose to 430 within four years. At the suggestion of the Prime Minister David Lloyd George, from January 1917, the labour exchanges came under the new Ministry of Labour and were renamed employment exchanges, so as to more accurately reflect their purpose and function.

The National Insurance Act was passed in 1911 and the first payments were made at Labour Exchange's in January 1913. Initially this covered only elected trades, such as building, engineering and shipbuilding. Weekly contributions were paid by workers, employers and the state in the form of stamps which were affixed to an Unemployment Book (later called the National Insurance card). When no work was available, benefit was payable.

The basic rules and administration regarding claims and the disallowance of benefit remain unaltered today. From 1918, payments were also made to unemployed ex-soldiers and their dependants, as well as to civilians who found themselves unemployed due to the decline of war production industries. The out-of-work donation scheme (an early version of "the dole") was originally only a temporary measure.

As unemployment benefit was payable only for those with a contributions record, and even then for only twelve months for each claim, there remained a group on long-term low incomes, without access to benefit. That was relieved after the enactment of the National Assistance Act 1948 (11 & 12 Geo. 6. c. 29), when payments began to be made to jobseekers on low incomes regardless of contributions.

=== Foundation of the Jobcentre ===
In 1973, the Labour Exchange's were rebranded by the Department of Employment, to become the first 'Jobcentres'. The Jobcentres were run by the Manpower Services Commission and featured orange signage and back decor. Dudley Smith explained in Parliament that the Jobcentres were often located in areas that would be convenient to women, such as high streets and shopping centres, to help attract women into the workforce. These Jobcentres did not process benefits, instead claimants had to 'sign on' at separate Unemployment Benefit Offices.

From the 1970s onwards, benefits were paid in the form of a girocheque, until the early-2000s, when payments would be made directly to the claimant's bank account.

In 1987, control of Jobcentres was moved from the Manpower Services Commission to the Secretary of State for Employment. This combined the Unemployment Benefit Offices with the Jobcentre and enabled benefits to be connected to individuals working status.

The first 56 Jobcentre Plus Pathfinder offices were brought into existence during October 2001.

As part of the Efficiency Savings Programme of 2004, changes were made to the structure and management of Jobcentre Plus as part of the governmental review headed by Sir Peter Gershon and Sir Michael Lyons to increase departmental efficiency amounting to £960 million; a target considered achievable in the period 2007–08. This initial plan was implemented within the Jobcentre structure as the Delivering our Vision Programme. Between 2005 and 2008, directors of the board were to be reduced in number from eight to six, the number of districts from seventy to fifty, the number of management and support staff employed were reduced by 5% and, amongst other things, the number of locations specifically employed to process claims would be reduced from 650 to 77.

In the 1990s, the Jobcentre enforced a dress code which required male members of staff to wear ties. The code was later held to be in breach of the Sex Discrimination Act 1975.

== Organisation ==
According to figures obtained by the Work and Pensions Select Committee during 2005–2006, the number of employees within the organisation amounted to 71,000. The amount of money released by the Department for Work and Pensions to people in work-related benefit amounted to £100 million.

The 2000 Makinson Report, written by John Makinson, led to the introduction of a team-based incentive scheme, created in order to improve staff efficiency. The scheme takes as a measure of this efficiency for the allocation of bonuses for teams meeting specific targets (known as a performance-related pay-system) the relative successes in each team of the factors:

- of a rating by point-system based on criteria of the priority of each person to have been guided back into work (Job entry)
- the relative results of assessment of customer Service
- the specifics of whether the vacancy was filled at all, and if so, then the time taken for the advertised employment to be met (a measure of the satisfaction of the employer (Employer Outcome)
- the delivery of service professionally and with regards to the effectiveness (accuracy) of the entire organisation as a business targets (Business Delivery)
- a measure of the cost of levels of error by staff and customers, and of the reduction of fraud by customers.

As of 2010, Jobcentre Plus had 750 offices and about 78,000 employees.

== Statistics ==
According to the Work and Pensions Select Committee the organisation caused directly or indirectly 700,000 people to return to work between the months of April 2005 and January 2006.

According to The Guardian newspaper, the total number of jobseekers in May 2012 was 1,590,708.

== Changes to the service (2011–2018) ==
During 2003, the DWP began to use Post Office accounts for the payment of benefits, a process that became fully operational at the beginning of the 2005 financial year. The accounts were licensed and the electronic benefits transfer banking engine was provided by the company JP Morgan Europe. Prior to these services the banking facility was provided by Citibank. In 2012, the payment system for benefits was streamlined, with all payments made into bank, building society or Post Office accounts, and the use of Girocheques was phased out by early 2013.

Jobcentre Plus also changed the way in which claims to benefits were processed. In earlier years, claimants had been required to contact their local benefits office, asked to manually complete the appropriate forms, and then booked an interview with an adviser to discuss any work-related issues and submit a benefits claim for processing. The new system instead asked individuals to telephone a Jobcentre Plus call centre, where claim details were taken over the phone and entered directly onto the computer system by the call agent. From summer 2012 new claimants with Internet access were strongly encouraged to make their claim online, and interview details were then sent to the claimant by text message. Customers were then asked to attend an interview at their local Jobcentre to discuss work issues with an adviser, and finalise their claim, provide relevant signatures and proof of ID and address.

In 2012, the DWP announced a pilot scheme under which all new job seekers in Merseyside were required to claim benefits online rather than in person at a Jobcentre Plus branch. This announcement was met with concern by Liverpool Wavertree MP Luciana Berger as well as the heads of the Public and Commercial Services Union and one member of Liverpool Council's cabinet. This was a partial pilot scheme for one part of the Universal Credit benefit, which replaced the income-based Jobseeker's Allowance and Employment Support Allowance, plus Child Tax Credit, Working Tax Credit, Income Support and Housing Benefit. The changeover commenced in October 2013.

The processing of benefits claims also changed at this time. Previously they had been processed at local benefit offices and jobcentres, but this practice was modernised so that they were processed at a smaller number of larger Benefit Centres.

The Work Programme was introduced in 2011, and was mandatory for all jobseekers from nine months onwards. Unlike the previous New Deal scheme which offered the choices of: training, help in setting up a business, or unpaid work placement in a field appropriate to the jobseeker, the Work Program required jobseekers to take unpaid work experience with local employers as designated by the Jobcentre. This led to much controversy regarding the inflexibility and lack of choices in the scheme.

From October 2012, all claimants applying for Jobseeker's Allowance were expected to look for work online, using Universal Jobmatch, an online system accessible from the government portal and powered by Monster.com, either at their local Jobcentre or from their home computer. Those jobseekers who did not possess the necessary computer skills were offered IT training. Jobseekers were expected to use 30 hours of their own time per week searching for jobs, on top of the mandatory Work Programme, or take part in community service.

Between 2012 and 2018, jobsearch facilities were available to anyone via the Universal Jobmatch website. This became the UK's most visited recruitment website with over a million visitors each week. Jobcentre Plus also offered services to employers and employment agencies, who could register their vacancies online through the online service or by calling Employer Direct. Vacancies were available immediately online.

On 14 May 2018, the Universal Jobmatch was replaced by the Find a Job service, accessible via the government portal and powered by Adzuna. The Universal Jobmatch service closed down on 17 June 2018.

== Winding-up ==
Jobcentre Plus as an executive agency ceased to exist as of 1 October 2011. Services offered by Jobcentre Plus are now offered directly by the Department for Work and Pensions. Although the Jobcentre Plus corporate brand remains in place at the present time, it functions only as a public brand of the Department, rather than a separate entity. In November 2024, plans were announced to merge the remaining 600 Jobcentre Plus locations with the National Careers Service to create a more centralised public service.

== Popular culture ==
The Jobcentre Plus service (and its forerunners the Social Security office, Unemployment Benefit office and Jobcentre/Labour Exchange) have featured in all forms of popular culture, often depicted in a general way to suggest poverty or unemployment. In the 1980s in particular, the Social Security office was frequently used as shorthand for the British recession.

Dramatic representations have included the sitcoms Hancock's Half Hour, Whatever Happened To The Likely Lads, Some Mothers Do 'Ave 'Em, Shelley, George and Mildred, Bread, Rab C. Nesbitt, the drama series Boys from the Blackstuff and the films Hot Enough for June, Made in Britain, The Full Monty and I, Daniel Blake.

In the black comedy series The League of Gentlemen, a recurring character is Pauline Campbell-Jones (played by Steve Pemberton), the demented leader of a Restart course for a group of unemployed people.

The ITV sitcom The Job Lot, starring Russell Tovey and Sarah Hadland, was set in a busy West Midlands job centre. The series was produced by Big Talk Productions and written by Claire Downes, Stuart Lane and Ian Jarvis.

Love on the Dole is a novel by Walter Greenwood, about working class poverty in 1930s northern England. It has been made into both a play and film.

British reggae band UB40 are named after the paper form with the same name (Unemployment Benefit, form 40) that was used to apply for unemployment benefit.

== See also ==
- Poor Relief Act 1601
- International Labour Organization
- Trades Union Congress
