= Benefits Agency =

Former executive agency in the UK

Executive Agency overview
- Formed: 1991
- Preceding Executive Agency: Department of Social Security
- Dissolved: 2001
- Superseding Executive Agency: Jobcentre Plus
- Jurisdiction: Great Britain
- Parent department: Department of Social Security

The Benefits Agency (BA) was an executive agency of the British Department of Social Security (subsequently the Department for Work and Pensions), set up in 1991 to "create and deliver an active modern social security service, which encourages and enables independence and aims to pay the right money at the right time". The BA was merged with the Employment Service in April 2001 to form Jobcentre Plus.
