= Universal Jobmatch =

British employment website

Universal Jobmatch was a British website for finding job vacancies. The site was developed in a collaboration between the Department for Work and Pensions (DWP) and Monster Worldwide, an American provider of employment services that operates Monster.com, a global employment website.

== History ==
=== The concept ===
The website replaced the JobCentre Plus' Job Search Tool and Employer Services Direct, which were part of the Directgov online system set up in the UK's New Deal employment system. The service was introduced as part of a Government project to enable the DWP to monitor client's jobsearch activities directly, and as part of its "Digital By Default" agenda to migrate more British citizens to subscribe to an online process when claiming both unemployed and in-work benefits. At the same time that Universal Jobmatch was switched on, the DWP closed its existing processes supporting Job Search and Employer Services Direct, migrating its customers to the new system, and reported that 460,000 employers were posting jobs and the site was receiving over 6 million searches per day.

By February 2013 there were 2 million registered users. The site was also more user-friendly and less verbose in mid 2013.

=== Mooted demise ===
According to a report in The Guardian in March 2014, leaked documents from the DWP indicated that the government had formulated plans to scrap Universal Jobmatch when the contract for the site came up for renewal in 2016, due to the numbers of fake and repeat job adverts posted to the site and because of cost concerns.

=== Replacement ===
On 26 April 2018 a message was placed on the home page saying the service would be replaced by "Find a job" on 14 May 2018. Users were advised to save their information by 17 June 2018 as logins would not be moved to the new system.

== Security problems ==
Hacktivists created an plug-in addition for the Google Chrome browser to allow the automatic distribution of CVs to any recruiters through Universal Jobmatch.

From January 2013, Universal Jobmatch stated regularly on their relevant web pages that users should "never ever give out things like scanned passports, national insurance numbers or bank account details until a job offer has officially been made".

== Issues ==
=== Early teething problems ===
Early controversy arose due to some of the people who registered with Universal Jobmatch being targeted by dubious organisations and individuals in financial scams. Channel 4 News ran a feature, in December 2012, which explained how this new government service was being used to obtain personal details of jobseekers.

=== Tender controversy ===
On 12 February 2014, it was revealed in a Freedom of Information Act request that Monster did not win the Universal Jobmatch tender, falling into last place on value and second to last place on evaluation scoring, until the service was put back out to tender. The UK Government paid £950,000 in compensation to Methods Consulting Limited and Jobsite UK (Worldwide) Limited, who should have won both tenders when the new contract was awarded. Concerns were raised as to how Monster's "satisfactory" evaluation score and high bid during the first tender, were followed by a near-perfect evaluation score and a bid of under half the original in the second tender. This change made them competitive, but resulted in allegations of insider dealing and corruption.

=== Benefit sanctions for non-compliance ===
From 1 March 2013, JobCentre Plus advisers could, if giving a good reason, require Jobseeker's Allowance claimants to use the site through a JobSeeker Direction. If they refused to comply, they could be recommended for a benefit sanction. A decision-maker took the final decision over whether benefit should be removed, which as a consequence of the UK Government's Welfare Reform Act 2012, could lead to a loss of state benefits for up to 3 years. Registered users had the option to allow the DWP to have access to their account to allow the department to monitor their activity, as requested by Monster, the site provider on behalf of the DWP. Whilst this was not mandatory, some claimants were threatened with benefit sanctions for not doing so.
