= Joanne McNeil =

American writer, editor, and art critic

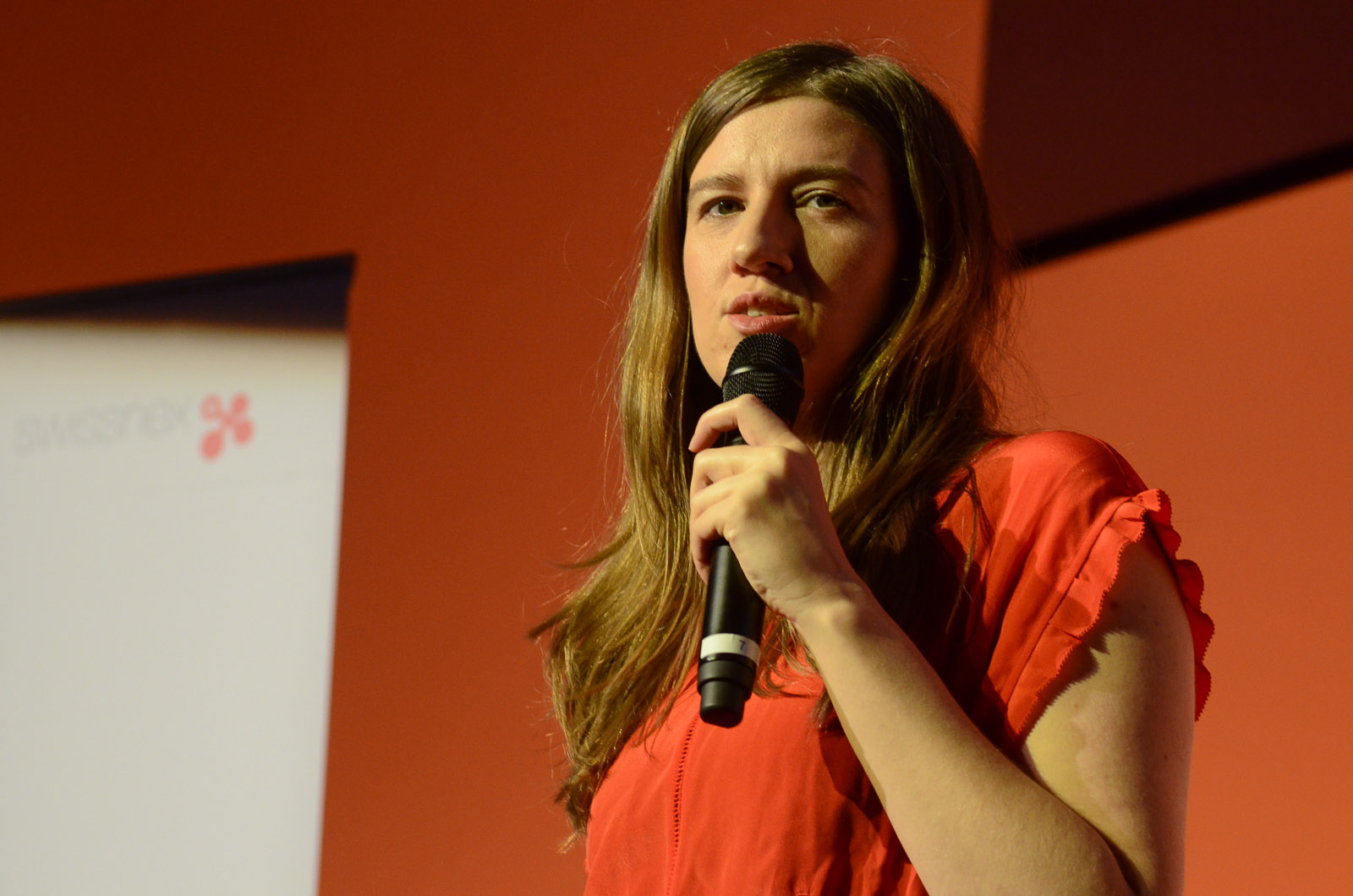
Joanne McNeil, 2014

Joanne McNeil is an American writer, editor, and art critic known for her personal essays on technology. She has written a non-fiction book on internet culture and a fiction novel.

McNeil founded and edited the now-defunct blog, The Tomorrow Museum, before becoming the editor of Rhizome at the New Museum, in 2011. She held the position through 2012, when she edited The Best of Rhizome 2012, published through LINK Editions/LINK Center for the Arts. She has contributed to Frieze, Los Angeles Times, Wired, and the Boston Globe. She currently maintains a column called Speculations for Filmmaker Magazine.

McNeil was part of two panels on the New Aesthetic: one called "The New Aesthetic" at SXSW 2012 and a follow-up called "Stories from the New Aesthetic" at the New Museum. McNeil was an Eyebeam resident. In 2015, McNeil was the inaugural recipient of the Thoma Foundation Digital Arts Writing Award for an emerging arts writer who has made significant contributions to the intersection of art and technology.

In 2020, McNeil published the non-fiction book Lurking: How a Person Became a User. The book provides a critical history of the Internet from the perspective of its users. In 2023, she published her first fiction novel, Wrong Way, which centers around a gig worker employed by a company deploying a fleet of autonomous vehicles.

== Books ==
- Lurking: How a Person Became a User (2020) ISBN 978-0374194338
- Wrong Way (2023) ISBN 9780374610661
