= Michael Barber, Baron Barber of Chittlehampton =

British educationalist

The Right Honourable The Lord Barber of Chittlehampton
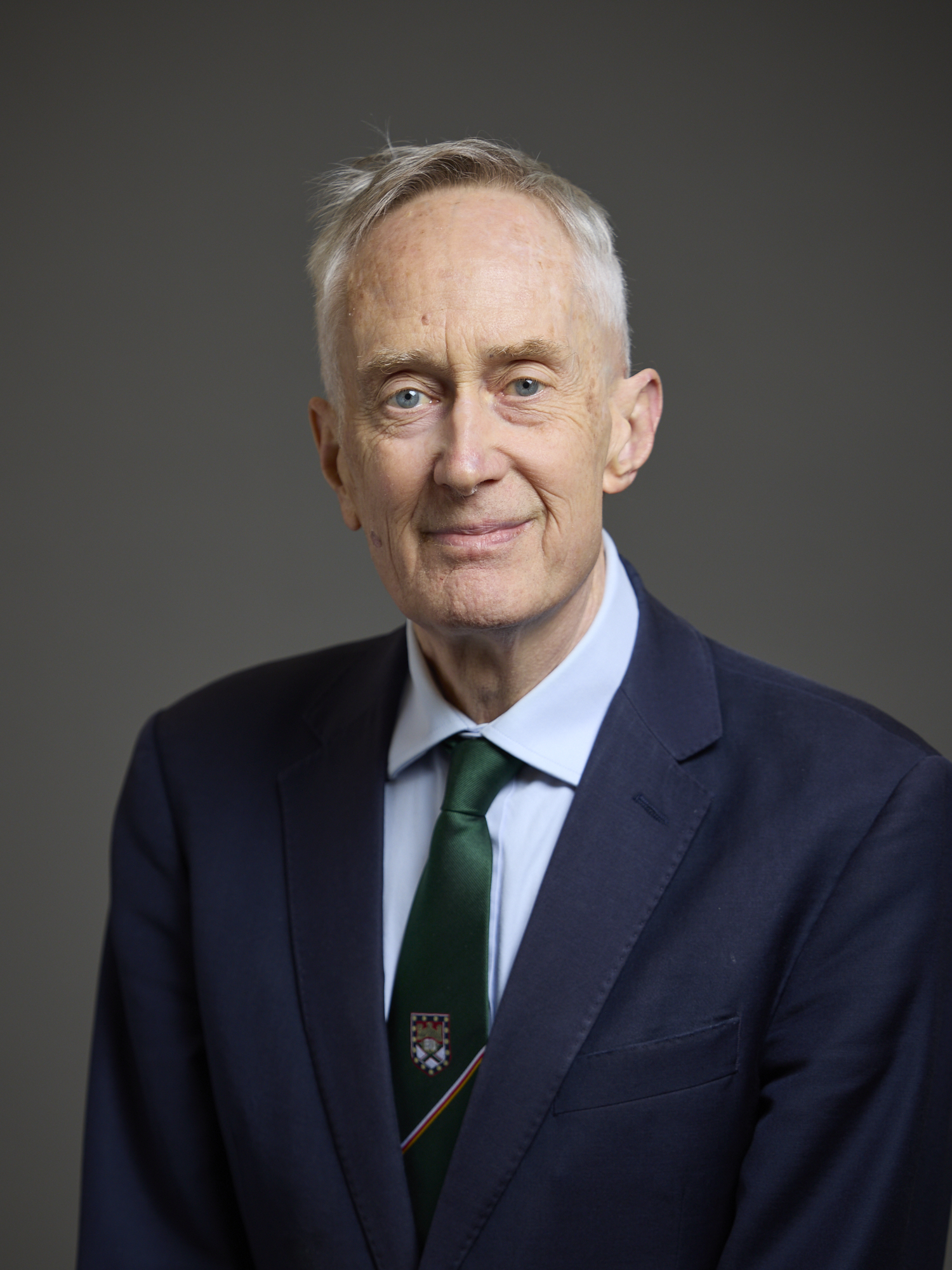
- Official portrait, 2026

Head of Prime Minister’s Delivery Unit
- In office 2001–2005

Prime Minister's Envoy to the Palestinian Authority
- Incumbent
- Assumed office 9 December 2024

Chairman of Somerset County Cricket Club
- In office 2022–2026

Chancellor of Exeter University
- Incumbent
- Assumed office 2022

Member of the House of Lords
- Lord Temporal
- Life peerage 21 January 2026

Personal details
- Born: Michael Bayldon Barber; 24 November 1955 (age 70) Liverpool, Lancashire, England
- Citizenship: Britain
- Party: Labour
- Education: University of Oxford

Michael Bayldon Barber, Baron Barber of Chittlehampton (born 24 November 1955) is a British former civil servant and educationist known for serving as head of the Prime Minister's Delivery Unit under Tony Blair’s government. He is the founder of Delivery Associates, a global advisory firm.

He has advised governments in over 60 countries on issues of public policy and delivery. He was the founder and first head of the Prime Minister's Delivery Unit under Prime Minister Tony Blair, and later served as chief education advisor at Pearson, and as a partner at McKinsey, where he was head of the global education practice. He served as co-chair of Boston Consulting Group's not-for-profit foundation, the Centre for Public Impact.

Barber published How to Run a Government: So that Citizens Benefit and Taxpayers Don’t go Crazy in 2015, and his second book, Accomplishment – How to achieve ambitious and challenging things, was published by Penguin in 2021.

In 2021, he was asked by the UK Prime Minister and Cabinet Secretary to conduct a review of government delivery after COVID-19. In January 2022, Barber was appointed Chancellor of the University of Exeter. In April 2022, Barber was announced as the new chairman of Somerset County Cricket Club. In December 2024, he was appointed Prime Minister Keir Starmer's envoy to the Palestinian Authority for governance.

== Education and early career ==
Barber was born in Liverpool, son of Chris Barber (1921-2012), chairman of Oxfam from 1983 to 1989, and Anne Satterthwaite, née Fowkes. His paternal grandmother's family owned Jacob's Biscuits, where his father worked from 1949 to 1980. He was educated at Bootham School in York. He studied history at the University of Oxford. He taught in schools in Britain and Zimbabwe.

Barber worked in the education department of the National Union of Teachers. As a member of the Labour Party, he was elected to the council of the London Borough of Hackney, becoming chair of the education committee. In 1987, he contested for Labour the seat of Henley, then held by Michael Heseltine.

== Government ==
Barber served as Chief Adviser to the Secretary of State for Education on School Standards during the first term of British Prime Minister Tony Blair, from 1997 to 2001.

During Blair's second term, from 2001 to 2005, Barber served as the Chief Adviser on Delivery, reporting directly to Prime Minister Tony Blair. As head of the Prime Minister's Delivery Unit (PMDU), he wrote a book about his experience at the PMDU. Instruction to Deliver: Fighting to Reform Britain’s Public Services (Methuen 2008), It was described by the Financial Times as "one of the best books about British Government for many years".

Barber was appointed as the first ever Chair of the Office for Students (OfS), the regulator for higher education in the UK established in 2018, until he stepped down in March 2021.

In 2024, Barber returned to government, when he was appointed by Prime Minister Keir Starmer as his special envoy to the Palestinian Authority.

== Advisory career ==
=== Delivery Associates ===
Barber is the founder of Delivery Associates, a global advisory firm, and was chair until May 2026.

==== Pakistan ====
Barber has served as the co-chair of the Pakistan Education Taskforce as DFID Special Representative on Education for Pakistan, which led to the development of the "Punjab Roadmap", with stated goals of increasing the quality of education at 60,000 schools in Punjab. The Good News from Pakistan, published in 2013 with Reform, summarises the change between August 2011 and January 2013.

The Independent Commission on Aid Impact has praised the Roadmap as "an excellent example of how a well-designed monitoring system can be integral to the design of a reform programme".

Barber also advised Dr Sania Nishtar, the Special Assistant to the Pakistan Prime Minister on Social Protection and Poverty Alleviation, on the Ehsaas Programme in Pakistan.

==== UK Government ====
Barber was asked by the UK Treasury in 2017 to conduct a review into how government measures impact each taxpayer pound spent on public services. The Public Value Review sets out the approach.

In 2021, Barber was asked by the Prime Minister and the Cabinet Secretary to review government delivery after COVID-19.

In November 2022, British Chancellor of the Exchequer Jeremy Hunt announced that Barber would serve in an advisory role on the government's skills reform programme.

=== McKinsey and Company ===
Barber served as partner and head of McKinsey's Global Education Practice until 2011. Barber published Deliverology 101 in 2011 to serve as a comprehensive guide to system reform and delivery. While at McKinsey, Barber co-authored How the world’s most improved school systems keep getting better (2010) and How the world’s best-performing schools come out on top (2007).

=== Education Delivery Institute ===
In the summer of 2010, Barber teamed with the Education Trust and Achieve to found the U.S. Education Delivery Institute. In 2010–2016, this institute worked with leaders of K–12 and higher education in the United States.

== Honours and appointments ==
Barber was knighted in the 2005 Birthday Honours. He has been a Distinguished Visiting Fellow at the Harvard T.H. Chan School of Public Health and the Harvard Graduate School of Education and is an Honorary Fellow of The Queen's College, Oxford. He was awarded honorary doctorates from the University of Exeter, the University of Warwick and the University of Wales. As part of the 2025 Political Peerages, Barber was nominated for a life peerage to sit in the House of Lords as a Labour peer; he was created as Baron Barber of Chittlehampton, of Chittlehampton in the County of Devon on 21 January 2026.

== Publications ==
- Instruction to Deliver
- Deliverology 101: A Field Guide for Educational Leaders
- How the world’s best-performing schools come out on top
- How the world’s most improved school systems keep getting better
- Oceans of Innovation
- An Avalanche is Coming: Higher Education and the Revolution Ahead
- The Incomplete Guide to Delivering Learning Outcomes
- Asking More: The Path to Efficacy
- The Public Sector: Managing the Unmanageable (Contributor)
- Deliverology in Practice
- How to Run a Government: So that Citizens Benefit and Taxpayers Don’t go Crazy
- Accomplishment - How to Achieve Ambitious and Challenging Things

Academic offices
Preceded by Paul Myners, Baron Myners	Chancellor of the University of Exeter; 2022–present	Incumbent
