= Andrew Pinder =

Andrew Pinder, CBE, (5 May 1947 – 9 April 2017) led the Office of the e-Envoy from 2000 to 2004, reporting directly to the prime minister, Tony Blair.

He held the post of chairman of Becta (a government agency, funded by the Department for Children, Schools and Families which oversees the e-strategy for Education and supports information and communications technology (ICT) and e-learning in schools and colleges) from January 2006 to January 2009.

He has held many executive posts in the public and private sector relating to IT.

== Early life ==
Pinder was born in 1947. He was educated at the University of Liverpool from 1969 until 1972 where he received a BA in Economics and Geography.

== e-Envoy ==
Pinder's most high-profile position was as the e-Envoy between October 2000 and August 2004, when he was responsible directly to the Prime Minister for coordinating the development of the knowledge economy in the UK.

In this role, he gave a speech at the CBI in November 2001.

He oversaw the rapid implementation in 2001 of the Government Gateway, a project for putting all the government services online, which was built by Microsoft in just 15 weeks and initially locked out all browsers except Microsoft's own Internet Explorer. He defended this by claiming that the limitation applied only to the part "which allows citizens and businesses to enrol for services. [But] once enrolled, they can submit transactions from any operating system, since XML - the language used - is totally platform independent."

The deal also involved Microsoft using UK government intellectual property to build products for other governments in order to recoup some of the costs of building the technology. The rate of return was to the tune of 22% of their gross sales of the intellectual property, which Pinder hoped would "give us quite a lot of money". This hope was reiterated by a minister for the Cabinet Office as late as January 2003.

Pinder appeared before the Public Accounts Committee on 13 May 2002, 12 June 2002 and 3 May 2002 where Edward Leigh MP was "surprised by the woolly answers"

On concluding the job, he pronounced his work a success.

== Other positions ==
- United Utilities, as non-executive director from September 2001 – 2010
- Entrust, as member of the board of directors 2004-2007 and as senior vice president from October 2006-15.
- Spring Group, as non-executive director, from March 2005 – 2009
- Intel's global advisory board, as member from January 2006 to 2010.
- Department for Business Enterprise and Regulatory Reform/Department for Culture Media and Sport/Ofcom/BBC as a senior adviser from 2006-2012 on UK digital television switchover programme and other issues relating to the leading edge of the TV industry.
- Elexon Ltd as chairman from 2010 to 2013
- PhonePay Plus, as chairman from 2012 to 2015, a UK regulator on behalf of Ofcom for Telecoms and Internet services using premium rate phone and carrier bill charging.
- Digital Mobile Spectrum Limited (DMSL), also known as at800, as lllChairman since January 2013. DMSL, a UK-based Company, has responsibility for mitigating potential interference issues arising from the coexistence of digital terrestrial television (DTT) and 4G mobile services in the 800 MHz band. Its board includes all UK MNOs, broadcasters (including the BBC), and Ofcom.

== Other previously held positions ==
- Becta Chair of the board of trustees from January 2006 to January 2009.
- Citibank head of European operations and technology, then head of global operations for Citibank’s Global Transactional Services business, between 1995 and 1999.
- Prudential Assurance, director of systems and business operations from 1990 to 1994.
- A partner in a venture capital firm and carried out a number of management consultancy assignments for the British government.
- Director of information technology at the Office of Inland Revenue. Employed there for 18 years until 1990.
- President at Gov3 Consulting, an ICT (& Public Policy) consulting company staffed by former members of the Office of the e-Envoy. He has since left the company and Gov3 was amalgamated and taken over by another firm in late 2009.
