= GB Group plc =

Identity verification software company

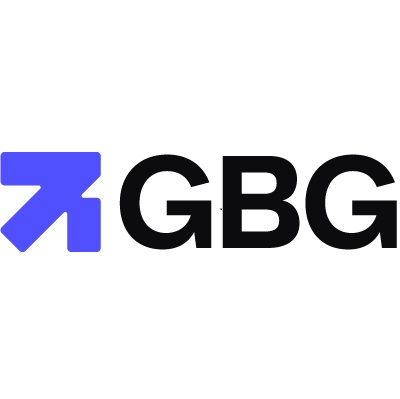
- Traded as: LSE: GBG
- Industry: Identity verification Location intelligence Fraud prevention
- Founded: 1989
- Headquarters: Chester, United Kingdom
- Key people: Richard Longdon (Chairman); Dev Dhiman (CEO)
- Revenue: ▲£285.0 million (2026)
- Operating income: ▲£67.5 million (2026)
- Net income: ▼£(75.1) million (2026)
- Number of employees: 1,100 (2026)
- Website: www.gbg.com

GB Group plc, trading as GBG, is an identity verification, location intelligence and fraud prevention company. It is listed on the London Stock Exchange.

== History ==
The company was founded by Trevor Burke as Phonelink Data in September 1989. It changed its name to Phonelink in May 1993, and launched a computer-based information service, known as TelMe in June 1994.

The company then changed its name again to TelMe.com in March 2000 and to TelMe Group in September 2001 and finally adopted its current name in February 2002. It was the subject of an initial public offering on the Alternative Investment Market in August 2010.

The company acquired PCA Predict, a provider of UK and international address validation services, for US$100 million in May 2017, bought IDology, a US identity verification company, for US$300 million in February 2019, and acquired Acuant, a US identity verification and identity fraud prevention company, for US$736 million in November 2021.

The Chicago-based fund, GTCR, expressed an interest in acquiring the company in September 2022. The company was admitted to the main market in October 2025.
