= J2 Ventures =

American venture capital firm

- Type: Private
- Industry: Venture capital
- Founded: 2020
- Founders: Alexander Harstrick; Jonathan Bronson
- Headquarters: Boston, Massachusetts, United States
- Key people: Alexander Harstrick and Jonathan Bronson (managing partners)

J2 Ventures is an American venture capital firm based in Boston that invests in early-stage "dual-use" companies whose products have both commercial and national-security applications. J2 is a firm led mostly by U.S. military veterans.

== History ==
J2 Ventures was founded around 2020 by Alexander Harstrick and Jonathan Bronson. Harstrick is a U.S. Army Reserve military intelligence officer who deployed to Afghanistan and Iraq in 2017 and later worked with the Defense Innovation Unit. Bronson holds a PhD in chemistry from Columbia University and previously worked at D. E. Shaw. The two met while working as emergency medical technicians at Columbia.

In September 2022, JPMorgan Chase was investing in the firm, describing it as the first veteran-led venture capital firm supported by the bank's Project Spark initiative.

== Funds ==
Fund	Year	Size
Inaugural fund	2021	about $68 million
Argonne Fund	2024	$150 million
Brookhaven Fund	2025	$250 million

== Investments ==
The firm backs startups that work closely with governments and helps them seek grants and other public funding, and that it does not invest in companies developing weapons or products intended to harm people. TechCrunch reported that the firm's healthcare investments target products for the roughly three million people employed by the U.S. military, and that it did not invest in areas such as drones, robotics or surveillance technology.

J2 Ventures has participated in funding rounds for several technology companies, including Aalyria, that raised $100 million in a Series B round in February 2026. Code Metal that raised $125 million in a Series B round the same month. Apex that raised $95 million in June 2024 and Oura, maker of the Oura Ring wearable.
