= Concessionary Bus Travel Act 2007 =

Act of Parliament of the United Kingdom

- Act of Parliament
- Parliament of the United Kingdom
- Long title: An Act to make provision about travel concessions; and for connected purposes.
- Citation: 2007 c. 29
- Introduced by: Lord Davies Captain of the Yeomen of the Guard and Government Deputy Chief Whip, 27 November 2006
- Territorial extent: England and Wales

Dates
- Royal assent: 19 July 2007
- Commencement: For certain preliminary planning and guidance purposes: 17 October 2007. In full: 1 April 2008
Other legislation
Amended by	Local Transport Act 2008; Local Democracy, Economic Development and Construction Act 2009

Status: Partly in force

History of passage through Parliament

Text of statute as originally enacted

Revised text of statute as amended

The Concessionary Bus Travel Act 2007 is an act of the Parliament of the United Kingdom which entitles all people resident in England who are either disabled or over the age of 60 to free travel on local buses at off-peak times anywhere within England (transport being a devolved matter and therefore within the purview of the Scottish Parliament, Senedd and Northern Ireland Assembly); previously, free travel had only been available within the recipient's local authority area.

According to Age UK free bus travel is a life line enabling older people to maintain independence and get to local services, notably health care and shopping. Free bus travel combats social isolation and increases social inclusion allowing older people to stay in touch with their friends and families.

The act gives free bus travel to eligible individuals between 9.30am and 11pm on weekdays. Local authorities are able to offer further concessions beyond those offered nationwide.

== Funding ==
Under the scheme, bus companies are compensated by local authorities for carrying passholders, and the authorities in turn receive funding from central Government to offset the cost, in the form of a special grant under s.88B of the Local Government Finance Act 1988, for which a total of £212 million has been allocated. This is distributed using a funding formula on the basis of four factors (eligible population, bus patronage, overnight visitors and retail floor space), in the following proportions:

	Proportion
Eligible population	5.1%
Bus patronage	41%
Overnight visitors	15.4%
Retail floor space	38.5%

The funding allocated by Government was criticised by some as inadequate, and some local authorities anticipate budget shortfalls as a result. The government defended its decision not to compensate local authorities on the basis of actual costs incurred on the grounds that "such an approach would mean that the central government would hold all the financial risks but have no commensurate control of how the risks are managed".

As of 2014 there is concern about funding for this service, government funding fell 39% from 2010 and local authorities are forced to pay for this at the expense of other services.

The local government spending squeeze means what is required by law is undeliverable unless county councils put in extra subsidy. Is it fair that a ratepayer is subsidising what government should be paying for in the first place?

— Leicestershire Conservative councillor responsible for transport, Peter Osborne

Rural bus services and less popular routes are being cut due to low funding and the Local Government Association plans to appeal to George Osborne, Chancellor of the Exchequer to reverse cuts and protect bus services under threat.

The concessionary fares scheme provides a lifeline for our most vulnerable residents to go shopping, pick up medication, attend doctor’s appointments or socialise with friends. However, it is now under real threat. Unless the Government commits to fully funding concessionary fares, elderly and disabled people will be left stranded with a free bus pass in one hand but no local buses to travel on in the other.

— Wakefield Local Government Area chair of the Economy and Transport Board, Councillor Peter Box

We know that bus services are vital for many older and disabled people. That is why the right to free travel is enshrined in law, and government provides funding to meet the cost of subsidising off peak travel for these groups. In addition, the Department for Transport provides funding to bus operators to help more services run and keep ticket prices down. The current level of this funding is protected until 2015/16

— Spokeswoman for the Department for Transport

== Passage through Parliament ==
As is common for uncontroversial measures, the Bill was introduced in the House of Lords, where it received cross-party support. It received third reading from the Lords on 5 February 2006, and from the Commons on 28 June, with minor amendments, including one allowing the Government to make payments from public funds to fund the scheme, since money bills cannot be started in the Lords. These amendments were agreed to on 5 July, and the Bill received Royal Assent on 19 July. Under the commencement order, the Bill entered into force to allow the making of some regulations by the Secretary of State, and for some other preliminary purposes, on 17 October 2007, and in full on 1 April 2008.
