= Prime Minister's Delivery Unit =

United Kingdom government organisation

The No 10 Delivery Unit (10DU) or Downing Street Delivery Unit, formerly known as the Prime Minister's Delivery Unit (PMDU), is a centre of government organisation in the United Kingdom, providing support to the Prime Minister on public service delivery. It reports to the Chief Secretary to the Prime Minister, Darren Jones since 2025.

It was initially created in June 2001 to monitor progress on and strengthen the British government's capacity to deliver on key campaign priorities of Prime Minister Tony Blair's second-term government: education, health, crime and transport. The Unit reported to the Prime Minister through the Head of the Civil Service (the Cabinet Secretary).

The Unit was abolished in 2010 but revived in 2021. In the interim an 'Implementation Unit' was set up in the Cabinet Office, with a similar remit.

== History ==
=== 2001–2010 ===
The Unit was initially headed by the Prime Minister's Chief Adviser on Delivery, who was initially Professor Sir Michael Barber. He left in mid-2005 and was replaced by Ian Watmore, the head of the Cabinet Office Delivery and Transformation Group, in January 2006. Following Ian Watmore's departure in mid-2007, Ray Shostak was appointed to the lead the unit. It worked alongside the Prime Minister's Strategy Unit.

The Unit worked in partnership with the HM Treasury, 10 Downing Street, the Cabinet Office and stakeholder departments within the Government of the United Kingdom, to assess delivery and provide performance management for the Government's top public priorities. From 2006 to 2010, the Unit was also jointly responsible for monitoring performance across all the indicators in the Public service agreements.

The Unit was abolished by the Coalition Government in October 2010, with remaining staff re-allocated to the Performance and Reform Unit in HM Treasury. Public Service Agreements were also abolished in June 2010. Ray Shostak left the Unit in December 2010 to join Core Assets Group. Ian Watmore, a former chief executive of the Football Association, was appointed Chief Operating Officer of the Efficiency and Reform Group in June 2010.

However in a 2025 interview on Political Currency, David Cameron and George Osborne stated it was a mistake to abolish the unit.

=== 2021–present ===
Prime Minister Boris Johnson restored the unit in the summer of 2021 after a review by Sir Michael Barber, with Emily Lawson as its director. Liz Truss had proposed disbanding the unit prior to her appointment as prime minister in 2022, and replacing it with a new Economic Unit ("to help Truss and her Chancellor Kwasi Kwarteng take on the ‘Treasury orthodoxy’ that Truss spent so much of her leadership campaign railing against"); but the unit survived her brief premiership. Lawson departed in August 2023, to be replaced by Alice Matthews.

After the 2025 British cabinet reshuffle, the unit was brought under the remit of the new Chief Secretary to the Prime Minister at the request of Prime Minister Keir Starmer.

== See also ==
- Prime Minister's Office (United Kingdom)
- Prime Minister's Strategy Unit
