= Mayank Prakash =

British business leader (born 1973)

Mayank Prakash CBE FBCS
- Education: Bachelor's Engineering Degree; Master's in Business Administration (Finance)
- Alma mater: Manchester Business School; Singularity University; Wharton Business School
- Employer: Pivotal Growth
- Known for: Strategy and P&L Growth
- Board member of: Uber; Softcat
- Awards: CBE in New Year Honours List; UK Most Influential Leader; Wharton Fellow; CIO of the Year
- Website: fca.org.uk thegazette.co.uk

Mayank Prakash (born 1973) is a business leader based in the United Kingdom. Awarded CBE in 2024 New Year Honours for services to the Tech industry, Computer Weekly magazine described him as "the most influential person in UK IT" in their 2017 awards.

Parakash serves on the boards of Uber in UK, Softcat and as Group Chief Executive Officer of UK mortgage consolidator, Pivotal.

== Qualifications ==
Mayank Prakash holds an MBA from Manchester Business School, is a Wharton Fellow, a BCS Fellow and an alumnus of Singularity University.

== Career history ==
Mayank Prakash started his career as a graduate engineer trainee at the Hewlett-Packard. He worked in the HCL JV starting with the entrepreneurial Frontline Solutions start-up venture and was soon after selected to join the senior management trainee programme and deputed to incubate ERP implementation capabilities working with the Big Four accounting firms at HCL Tech.

Prakash was the international CIO of Avaya, then the group CIO of iSoft and later the CIO of Sage Group in UK. Prakash was hired by Morgan Stanley to lead the tech and data team of Morgan Stanley Wealth and Asset Management and as director of Morgan Stanley Advantage Services.

In 2014, Prakash left Morgan Stanley to join the Department for Work and Pensions as the director general in charge of technology, replacing Andy Nelson. In this role, Prakash combines his predecessor's job as CIO with business transformation, security and data responsibilities, and worked directly for Sir Robert Devereux. The large-scale impact to launch digital services for 22 million users to reduce UK's largest contact centre estate is widely covered from Forbes to CIO.com.

Subsequently, he joined FTSE100 Centrica as the chief consumer digital and information officer. As Centrica sold its North American business, Prakash was head hunted to join UK's largest wealth and professional services group Evelyn Partners managing professional services, digital wealth, fund services and core wealth lines of business. As the General Manager, Group Chief Operating Officer, he has led the market beating revenue and profit growth. Prakash also led UK's fast growing £11bn fund services business Evelyn Partners Fund Solutions Limited.

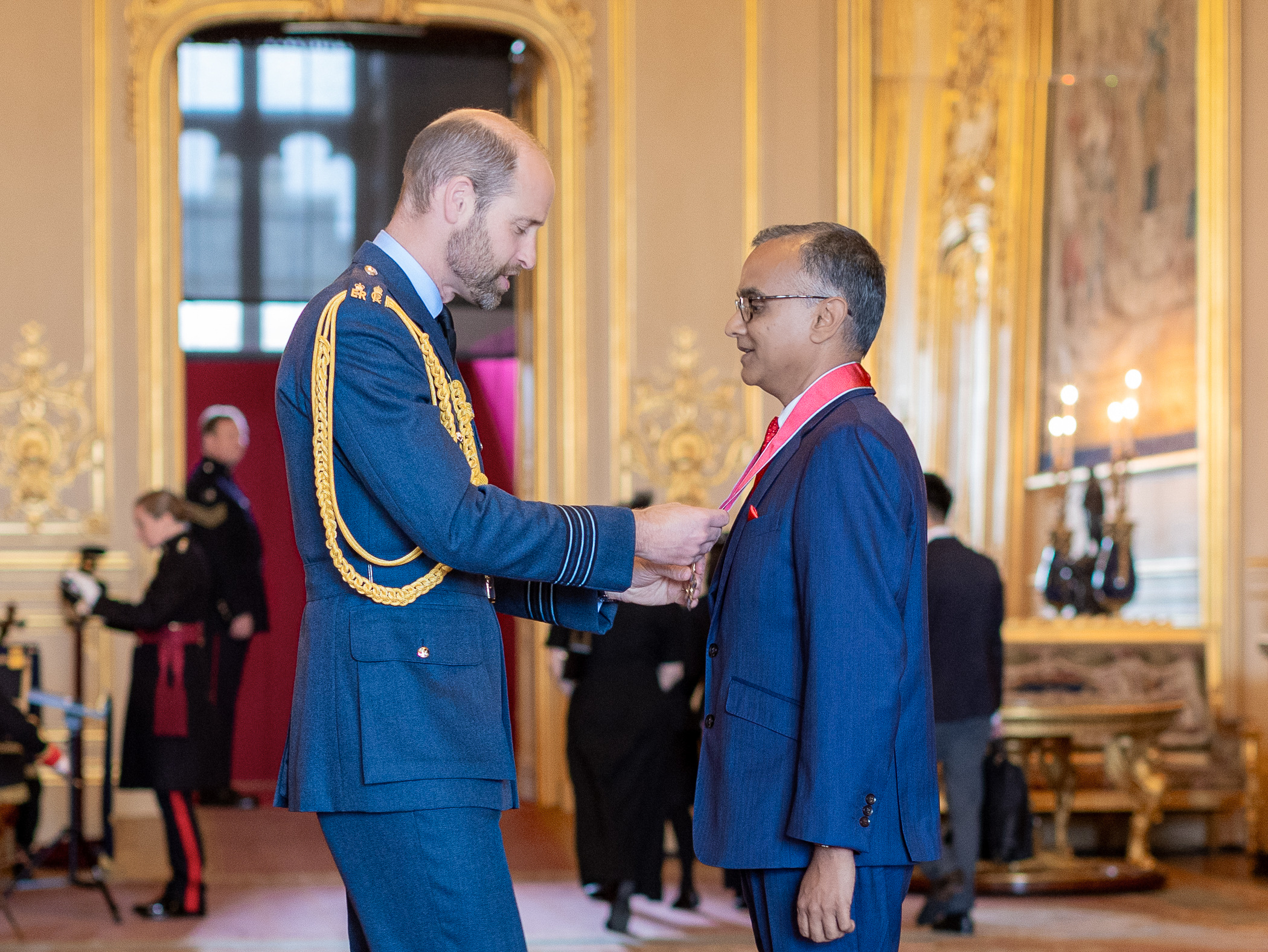
Mayank Prakash CBE Investiture

He was selected as the President of the British Computer Society in 2022. The British Computer Society is the Chartered Institute for Technology. Prakash was the Chair of the Board and also led the Nominations and Remuneration Committee of the Trustee Board. Prakash was also the chair of WealthTech Advisory Council for PIMFA which represents managers of £1.6 trillion assets for three years.

Following planned PE divestments at Evelyn Partners, Prakash now leads UK's largest mortgage advice consolidator on a mission to raise market standards for millions of homeowners for whom buying a home is a key financial and personal decision.

== Current roles ==
Mayank Prakash is the Group CEO of Pivotal Growth, UK's largest mortgage advice consolidator backed by Pollen Street Capital.

Prakash joined the board of Uber as a non-executive director. His impact on Uber's market leading drive to 100% EV vehicles in London is accelerating electrification. Prakash is a Director on the Board of Softcat, which continues to deliver market beating organic growth exceeding expectations.
