= Identity verification service =

Authentication of users' identities

An identity verification service is used by businesses to ensure that users or customers provide information that is associated with the identity of a real person. The service may verify the authenticity of physical identity documents such as a driver's license, passport, or a nationally issued identity document through documentary verification. Additionally, it also involves the verification of identity information (fields) against independent and authoritative sources, such as a credit bureau or proprietary government data.

== Background ==
Identity verification services were developed to help companies comply with Anti-Money Laundering (AML) and Know Your Customer (KYC) rules. Identity verification is now a key component of the transaction ecosystems of e-commerce companies, financial institutions, online gaming, and social media. Through adopting digital fraud prevention methods, businesses can achieve AML and KYC compliance while addressing the risks associated with fraud.

In financial industries, verifying identity is often required by regulations known as Know Your Customer or Customer Identification Program. In the US, one of the many bodies regulating these procedures is the Financial Crimes Enforcement Network (FinCEN). The Financial Action Task Force (FATF) is a global anti-money laundering and terrorist financing watchdog organization.

A nondocumentary identity verification requires the user or customer to provide personal identity data, which is sent to the identity verification service. The service checks public and proprietary private databases for a match on the information provided. Optionally, knowledge-based authentication (KBA) questions can be presented to the person providing the information to ensure that he or she is the owner of the identity. An identity "score" is calculated, and the identity of the user or customer is either given the "verified" status or not, based on the score.

Customers of various businesses, such as retail merchants, government entities, or financial institutions, are often required to present an identification to complete a transaction. For instance, a merchant may require customer identification for various types of purchases (e.g., alcohol, lottery, or tobacco purchases) or when certain types of payments (e.g., checks, credit cards) are presented to pay for transactions. Financial institutions usually require customers to present a form of identification to complete a withdrawal or deposit transaction, cash a check, or open a new account. Government entities may require identification for access into secure areas or other purposes. Other businesses may also require identification from customers.

Artificial intelligence–based identity verification is performed through a webcam, and the results are available in real time and are more accurate than the untrained eye. However, there have been concerns about Eurocentric bias in artificial intelligence and how that could affect the accuracy of results.

== Application ==
Industries that use identity verification services include financial services, digital businesses, travel and leisure, sharing economy businesses, telecom, FinTech, gaming and entertainment.

Identity verification services exist both online and in-person to verify identities. These services are used in the financial services industry, e-commerce platforms, social networking sites, Internet forums, dating sites, and wikis to curb sockpuppetry, underage signups, spamming and illegal activities like harassment, Identity fraud, and money laundering. For example, banks may require identity verification to open an account.

There is an increasing call for regulation with the rise in popularity of cryptocurrency exchanges. In December 2020, the U.S. government's Financial Crimes Enforcement Network (FinCEN) proposed rules to require banks and money service businesses (MSBs) such as cryptocurrency wallets to submit reports, keep records, and verify the identity of users who perform transactions with convertible virtual currency.

== Services ==
In the United States, ID.me and Login.gov are two providers of identity verification and authentication services for government services. GOV.UK Verify was a similar service developed by the British Government Digital Service.

The United States Department of Homeland Security's Remote Identity Validation Rally (RIVR) evaluated commercial technologies for remote identity verification across document validation and biometric presentation-attack detection. In reporting on the results, Incode and Microblink were identified in the document-validation track, and Identy.io, Paravision and IDEMIA Public Security in the presentation-attack detection track. Microblink was the only participating vendor to meet the performance goal for document false acceptance, with a reported rate of 0.88%. Its system error rate was 0%, while its document false-rejection rate was 3.15%.

== See also ==
- Identity assurance
- Identity management
- Identity management system
