= Office of the e-Envoy =

UK government body

The Office of the e-Envoy was set up by the British government of Prime Minister Tony Blair in 1999 and was replaced by the E-Government Unit in September 2004.

The first e-Envoy was Alex Allan. He was succeeded by Andrew Pinder in October 2000 until the office closed in September 2004.

Its staffing level was between 50 and 140 people.

== Government Gateway ==
This flagship project of putting all government departments online by 2002 and enabling people to conduct a wide variety of routine transactions, from paying taxes to obtaining driving licences, via the internet by 2005 was announced by Microsoft on 27 March 2001 who, in just 15 weeks, had "brought Tony Blair's ambitious e-government vision to reality". The tight timescale was due to Compaq withdrawing from the project after four months for which they received £5.6 million.

The project was billed at £15.6 million and involved licensing some of the UK government's intellectual property to Microsoft to be sold on as part of their product to other governments around the world and return significant income streams.

The result was widely criticised because the digital certificate system, central to the project, locked out all other browsers except Microsoft's own Internet Explorer.

The e-Envoy responded by explaining that the priority was to make it available to as many people as possible as quickly as possible, and that the only part of the system that was limited was the ability for citizens and businesses to enrol for services. But, "Once enrolled, they can submit transactions from any operating system, since XML - the language used - is totally platform independent."
