= Government Digital Service =

Unit of the UK government charged with digital government services

Agency overview
- Formed: 11 December 2011
- Jurisdiction: Government of the United Kingdom
- Headquarters: 10 Whitechapel High Street, London
- Agency executive: Joanna Davinson, Government Chief Digital Officer
- Parent department: Department for Digital, Culture, Media and Sport
- Website: www.gov.uk/government/organisations/government-digital-service

The Government Digital Service is a unit of the Government of the United Kingdom's Department for Digital, Culture, Media and Sport, tasked with transforming the provision of online public services.

It was formed in April 2011 by David Cameron's Conservative government to implement the "Digital by Default" strategy proposed by a report produced for the Cabinet Office in 2010 called Directgov 2010 and beyond: revolution not evolution. It is overseen by the Public Expenditure Executive (Efficiency & Reform). GDS is primarily based in the Whitechapel Building, London. As of August 2025, the organisation is led by the Government Chief Digital Officer, Joanna Davinson, who was previously Government Chief Digital Officer at the Central Digital and Data Officer, and Chief Digital Information Officer at the Home Office before that.

Originally part of the Cabinet Office since inception, in July 2024, it was announced by the Starmer ministry that the GDS would be moving to become part of the Department for Science, Innovation and Technology. In January 2025 DSIT announced that a number of organisations, including the GDS, would be merged into one organisation, which would be known as the Government Digital Service. In July 2026, it was announced by the Burnham ministry that the GDS would be moved to the Department for Digital, Culture, Media and Sport.

== GOV.UK ==
On 20 July 2010, Directgov, the citizen services website, was moved to the Cabinet Office from the Department for Work and Pensions. From 1 April 2011 Directgov became part of the Government Digital Service, along with the BusinessLink website aimed at business users. On 13 September 2012, through a notice on the Directgov homepage, it was announced that the GOV.UK project, built by the Government Digital Service, would replace Directgov as the primary citizen website of the UK Government on 17 October 2012, after which both Directgov and BusinessLink would close.

== "Digital by Default" strategy ==
The strategy was proposed in a report called "Directgov 2010 and beyond: revolution not evolution" prepared by Martha Lane Fox, the founder of lastminute.com. In an interview, Francis Maude, minister with responsibility for GDS spoke about "powerful oligopolies" and the reliance on a single supplier as a cause of high-profile failures in public sector IT, such as NHS Connecting for Health. GDS is intended to "drive service delivery to digital across government and provide support, advice and technical expertise for departments as they develop new digital delivery models". This strategy is focussed on the application of Agile software development and Lean software development methodologies, supplied primarily via small and medium enterprises rather than large suppliers.

GDS has a Digital Advisory Board consisting of high-profile external experts, which meets bi-annually and advises the GDS on strategy.

As of 2013, less than 2 years after GDS began, GDS had over 200 staff; by 2015 that number had risen to approximately 500.

== Government design principles ==
In 2012, GDS published their Government design principles. This set of principles was influential both inside of the UK government and also globally.

1. Start with user needs
2. Do less
3. Design with data
4. Do the hard work to make it simple
5. Iterate. Then iterate again
6. This is for everyone
7. Understand context
8. Build digital services, not websites
9. Be consistent, not uniform
10. Make things open: it makes things better

== Government as a platform ==
GDS has since mid 2013 promoted the concept of government as a platform, an idea first set out by Tim O'Reilly in 2009 in an article in Forbes. Government as a Platform introduces "a new vision for digital government; a common core infrastructure of shared digital systems, technology and processes on which it's easy to build brilliant, user-centric government services".

The original Government as a Platform products have been joined by new ones and are collectively known as Digital Service Platforms. These include GOV.UK Pay, GOV.UK Notify, GOV.UK Forms, the Design System, GOV.UK Frontend and the UK Emergency Alerts system.

== GOV.UK Verify ==
In 2011, GDS was given responsibility for setting cross-government standards for identity assurance, with the authority to approve, commission and accredit the identity component of any central government public service. GDS then designed and built GOV.UK Verify. GOV.UK Verify was intended to act as a single sign on framework for government services like filing taxes or checking driving license information. The system allowed the user to choose from a list of companies certified to verify their identity to government. These companies had to meet published standards for identity assurance.

The Infrastructure and Projects Authority (IPA) conducted a review of Verify in July 2018, and found Whitehall departments were reluctant to continue funding the project. A subsequent report by the IPA recommended that the GOV.UK Verify identity assurance programme should be terminated.

GOV.UK Verify closed in April 2023 and was replaced by GOV.UK One Login.

== Legacy ==
The GDS service has influenced similar projects elsewhere in the world, including:

- United States Digital Service
- 18F
- Canadian Digital Service
- DigitalService for Germany.
- Government Technology Agency of Singapore

They have also influenced local and regional governments, such as:

- Colorado Digital Service
- Ontario Digital Service
- Georgia's Office of Digital Services & Solutions

== Parliamentary review ==
In July 2018, the Science and Technology Select Committee announced that it would be carrying out a review into the work of GDS. In 2021, some of the functions of GDS were moved to the Central Digital and Data Office, both sit under Cabinet Office. In 2023, there was a major review of government efficacy, overseen by Francis Maude, that recommended re-uniting the two departments.

In 2024, the Labour government, announced that both GDS and CDDO were moved to the Department for Science, Innovation and Technology. In January 2025 the GDS, CDDO, Incubator for Artificial Intelligence, Geospatial Commission and parts of the Responsible Tech Adoption Unit would be merged into a new organisation, which would still be known as GDS.

== Responsible AI Advisory Panel ==
The Responsible AI Advisory Panel was established by the GDS, which operates under the Department for Science, Innovation and Technology. Its primary goal is to provide expert strategic advice, guidance, and scrutiny to senior government officials and ministers regarding the responsible development and deployment of artificial intelligence across the UK public sector.

The panel brings together external experts from across industry, academia, civil society, and the wider public sector to inform best practices for developing responsible artificial intelligence. Operating in an advisory capacity, the group supports the government's broader strategy to ensure public sector technology solutions avoid potential harms, maintain public trust, and align with ethical standards such as the Algorithmic Transparency Recording Standard.

== See also ==
- Central Computer and Telecommunications Agency
- Office of the e-Envoy
- E-Government Unit
- Mike Bracken
- Transformational Government
- United States Digital Service, US equivalent
