= Gov.uk =

Official website of the Government of the United Kingdom

GOV.UK

- Screenshot of gov.uk's landing page as of 4 November 2026
- Website type: Government information
- Available in: 2 languages
- List of languages English and Welsh
- Owner: HM Government
- Creator: Government Digital Service
- Website: gov.uk
- Commercial: No
- Registration: No
- Launched: 1 February 2012; 14 years ago
- Current status: Online
- Content license: Crown copyright Open Government Licence

gov.uk (styled on the site as GOV·UK) is a United Kingdom public sector information website, created by the Government Digital Service to provide a single point of access to HM Government services. The site launched as a beta on 31 January 2012, following on from the AlphaGov project. The website uses a modified digital version of the Transport typeface called New Transport. It officially replaced Directgov and the online services of Business Link on 17 October 2012. As of January 2023, GOV.UK is the second-most-used government website worldwide, after Russia's Gosuslugi.

The website was planned to replace the individual websites of hundreds of government departments and public bodies by 2014. By 1 May 2013, all 24 ministerial departments had their URLs redirected to gov.uk. As of March 2022, GOV.UK hosts pages for 23 ministerial departments, 20 non-ministerial departments, and over 410 agencies, public corporations, and other public bodies.

== History ==
The first ministerial departments and other organisations moved to the Inside Government section of gov.uk on 15 November 2012. On 12 December 2012, a further three departments migrated, bringing the total of ministerial departments to six out of a total of 24. By 1 May 2013, all 24 ministerial departments, as well as UK embassies around the world, had transferred to gov.uk.

On 16 April 2013, gov.uk won Design of the Year 2013 at the Design Museum awards. The Government Digital Service has also won a D&AD "Black Pencil" award for their work. In 2019, gov.uk won a D&AD "Wood Pencil" award for its Step-by-Step digital design pattern.

In 2018, the Government Digital Service introduced the GOV.UK Design System, with the intention of having styles, components, and patterns in a centralised location to support government departments in utilising GOV.UK.

On 19 February 2024, gov.uk updated their logo to reflect the depiction of the crown as the Tudor crown used by King Charles III in his cypher and coat of arms. The logo was further changed in June 2025, raising the dot and changing its colour to cyan as part of wider changes to gov.uk's branding. Estimated to cost £532,000, the change was criticised by some media outlets as being wasteful, but was defended by branding and design outlets.

=== Alphagov ===
Alphagov was the project name of the experimental prototype website built by the Government Digital Service, which was launched on 11 May 2011 by the Cabinet Office. The website was open for public comment for two months in order to judge the feasibility of a single domain for British Government web services.

Launched in response to the report by Martha Lane Fox, Directgov 2010 and Beyond: Revolution Not Evolution, published in November 2010, Alphagov sought to act as a proof of concept for the way citizens could interact with the government through a series of useful online tools that were more useful than published content alone.

As well as improving the 'citizen experience' of using government web services online, the project also identified the potential for £64 million in yearly savings on the central government's annual £128 million web publishing bill. The initial consultation period was completed in June 2011. A beta version was then created, which led to the launch of GOV.UK.

== Login ==
The Government Gateway is gradually being replaced by GOV.UK One Login.

== See also ==
- Data.gov.uk
- Directgov
- gov.br
