= Online age verification in the United Kingdom =

Example of an honor-based age verification dialog box displayed upon entering a website. Such methods have been described as inefficient and are not considered valid enforcement in most modern jurisdictions.

Online age verification in the United Kingdom was originally proposed in the Digital Economy Act 2017 before being abandoned, then brought in through measures contained in the Online Safety Act 2023. The law requires mandatory age verification for accessing internet pornography as well as other content deemed to be harmful.

In 2023, the Online Safety Act both repealed the Digital Economy Act duties, and reintroduced a new duty for adult content to be subject to age checks under a different regulator. Additionally, at the time of its introduction, platforms began to require age verification to distinguish children from adults, in order to remove access to content deemed to be risky. As the privacy standards of the different age check tools are regulated only under data protection law, such as the UK General Data Protection Regulation, campaigners have raised concerns about the trustworthiness and safety of using these tools.

== Digital Economy Act (2017 to 2019) ==
With the passing of the Digital Economy Act 2017, the United Kingdom became the first country to pass a law containing a legal mandate on the provision of an Internet age verification system. Under the act, websites that published pornography on a commercial basis would have been required to implement a "robust" age verification system to prevent minors from accessing their sites. The regulator would have been empowered to fine those who fail to comply up to £250,000 (or up to 5% of their turnover), to order the blocking of non-compliant websites, and to require those providing financial or advertising services to non-compliant websites to cease doing so.

After a series of setbacks, the planned scheme was eventually abandoned in 2019, and the legislative provisions creating it were repealed by the Online Safety Act 2023. Their new bill will affect all websites and internet by 25 July 2025.

=== 2019 duties through to cancellation ===
The British Board of Film Classification (BBFC) was planned to be charged with enforcing the scheme. The implementation of the law was initially delayed multiple times to allow the BBFC to draft and receive approval for official guidelines regarding the age verification requirements. Following the passage of the Online Pornography (Commercial Basis) Regulations 2019 (which established a legal definition for the types of websites that would be subject to the requirements), implementation was again rescheduled, this time for a planned start date of April 2019. In March 2019, reports stated that there was still no firm date for the implementation of this policy, which had been beset by many technical problems. A BBC report at the time described implementation of the scheme as being "in a holding pattern".

Key issues with the implementation included what constituted an effective means of age verification, as well as concerns over the possibility that online age verification providers could collect excessive personally identifiable information and process it for other purposes—potentially in violation of the General Data Protection Regulation (GDPR). "AgeID", a service proposed by internet pornography company MindGeek, was singled out by critics due to concerns that offering this service could unduly enhance its market position. The BBFC suggested that a system of gift card-like vouchers, purchased in person with ages checked by the retailer (identically to other age-restricted purchases such as alcohol) could provide a more anonymous and secure solution to age verification.

Technical concerns included the use of VPNs and DNS over HTTPS, both of which make it more difficult to perform man-in-the-middle attacks such as those required for effective Internet blocking.

On 17 April 2019, regulators stated that the law would officially be effective from 15 July 2019. However, on 20 June, the government announced that it had decided to delay implementation yet again, this time for another six months, for reasons including the government's failure to notify the scheme to the European Commission, and further concerns with technical issues.

On 16 October 2019, the Culture Secretary Nicky Morgan stated that the government had abandoned the mandate altogether, in favour of replacing it with a forthcoming wider scheme of Internet regulation based on the principles expressed in the Online Harms White Paper.

In January 2020, a group of age verification companies started a legal action against the government, seeking a judicial review of its decision to suspend the age verification scheme. The companies included AgeChecked Ltd, AVSecure, AVYourself and VeriMe. The applicants contended that the Digital Economy Act 2017 gave the government the power to delay implementation but not to abandon it, and sought around £3 million in damages. In July 2020, they won permission for a judicial review.

The mandate was formally repealed by section 212 of the Online Safety Act 2023, which came into force immediately upon that act receiving royal assent on 26 October 2023.

== Online Safety Act duties ==
Under the 2023 act, platforms and social media that provide pornography, or material relating to suicide, self-harm or eating disorders, are obliged to verify the age of their users to ensure they are not under 18. The act specifies that age verification techniques must be robust, but does not require any further duties regarding privacy or security. Sites that do not comply may face fines, or be blocked in the UK by Internet service providers.

Although the act does not require children to be identified through age verification, some platforms including Reddit (via Persona) and Bluesky (via Kids Web Services) opted in 2025 to use age verification in order to distinguish adults from children.

== Other proposals ==
In January 2026, the government started a consultation on policies that would create a "safer digital childhood", including the possibility of a social media ban for children similar to the Australian ban.

While debating the Children's Wellbeing and Schools Bill, the House of Lords accepted an amendment requiring the government to extend age verification to virtual private networks. As of April 2026, the bill has yet to become law.

While debating the 2026 Crime and Policing Bill, the government sought to add a clause allowing ministers to amend the Online Safety Act to mitigate the risk of harm from AI-generated content by statutory instrument. This was criticised by the Hansard Society as an example of overly-broad "Henry VIII power" that undermines Parliamentary scrutiny.

== See also ==
- Campaign Against Censorship
- Internet censorship in the United Kingdom
- NO2ID
- Privacy in English law
- Right to privacy
- Think of the children
- Web blocking in the United Kingdom
- Online age verification laws by country
