= Online Pornography (Commercial Basis) Regulations 2019 =

Statutory instrument intended to regulate access to pornographic websites in the UK

- Statutory Instrument
- Parliament of the United Kingdom
- Citation: SI 2019/23

Dates
- Made: 10 January 2019
Other legislation
Made under	Digital Economy Act 2017

Text of statute as originally enacted

The Online Pornography (Commercial Basis) Regulations 2019 (SI 2019/23) is a statutory instrument issued under the powers given by the Digital Economy Act 2017. It defines the criteria to determine which websites would have been required to implement an age verification scheme, as part of the proposed UK Internet age verification system, the implementation of which was eventually abandoned in October 2019.

== Definition ==
For the purpose of the regulations, a site is defined as making pornographic material available on a commercial basis for the purposes of the Act if:

- the pornographic material is available only as paid content or
- the pornographic material is available for free, but those posting the material are (or reasonably expect to be) remunerated and
  - the age-verification regulator cannot reasonably assume less than one third of the site's content is pornographic or
  - the site is advertised as a pornographic site

The government's explanatory notes to the draft regulations laid before Parliament in 2018 note that "the focus of the legislation should be pornographic websites, rather than popular social media platforms on which pornographic material is only a small part of the overall content".

== Implementation ==
The British Board of Film Classification was appointed as the age-verification regulator in 2018.

After numerous false starts, the government abandoned the scheme. On 16 October 2019, the culture secretary Nicky Morgan stated that the government had abandoned the mandate altogether, in favour of replacing it with a forthcoming wider scheme of Internet regulation.

== See also ==
- Censorship in the United Kingdom
- Online Safety Act 2023
