= Yehudis Fletcher =

British author and campaigner

- Born: 1988 (age 37–38); Glasgow, Scotland
- Education: University of Salford
- Occupations: Author, campaigner, independent sexual violence adviser
- Known for: Co-founding Nahamu
- Notable work: Chutzpah: A Memoir of Faith, Sexuality and Daring to Stay (2025)

Yehudis Fletcher (born 1988) is a British author, campaigner and independent sexual violence adviser. She is a co-founder of Nahamu, a think tank that campaigns against what it describes as extremist practices within strictly Orthodox Jewish communities in the United Kingdom, including forced marriage and the denial of secular education. Her memoir, Chutzpah: A Memoir of Faith, Sexuality and Daring to Stay, was published by Transworld in 2025 and was longlisted for the 2026 Wingate Literary Prize.

== Early life ==
Fletcher was born in Glasgow around 1988 and was raised in a Charedi family; her father, Michael Fletcher, was a rabbi and minister of the Queens Park Hebrew Congregation in Glasgow. As a teenager she lived for a period in Israel with her parents, and at fifteen was sent to live with a family in Prestwich, Greater Manchester. She was married twice by the age of twenty, in arranged marriages, and was twice divorced. She studied social policy at the University of Salford, having gained her university place without GCSEs with the support of the charity Mavar.

== Advocacy ==
In 2019 Fletcher co-founded Nahamu with Eve Sacks, a think tank established to address what its founders characterise as "inward-facing" extremism in Jewish communities. In February 2021 she co-authored a Nahamu position paper on forced marriage, submitted to the Home Office, which argued that some arranged marriages in Charedi communities meet the legal threshold of forced marriage and called for greater protection for those affected. The paper was debated on BBC Radio 4's Woman's Hour, where Fletcher discussed it with communal leaders who disputed its findings.

Fletcher was among those consulted during the independent review of government engagement with faith groups led by Colin Bloom. When the review was published in April 2023, she supported its recommendations on schools, coercion within marriage, and faith-based extremism and exploitation.

In September 2024 Nahamu published a report on education in Charedi communities, arguing that many boys in unregistered yeshivas receive little or no secular education; Fletcher said she hoped the report would inform the Children's Wellbeing and Schools Bill, then before Parliament. The report was criticised by Chinuch UK, a representative body for Charedi schools, which described it as biased and inaccurate. Nahamu submitted written evidence on the bill to the Public Bill Committee. The Children's Wellbeing and Schools Act 2026, which received royal assent in April 2026, introduced registers of children not in school and strengthened regulation of independent educational institutions.

Fletcher works as an independent sexual violence adviser (ISVA) at Migdal Emunah, a charity supporting Jewish victims of sexual abuse. She is a member of the second cohort of the Created Equal Educators Fellowship at the Shalom Hartman Institute.

== Grynhaus case ==
As a teenager, Fletcher was sexually abused by Todros Grynhaus, a religious teacher in the Manchester Charedi community, while she was a lodger in his family's home. Grynhaus fled to Israel in 2013 and was deported to the United Kingdom the following year; in 2015, after a first trial ended with a hung jury, he was convicted at Manchester Crown Court of seven sexual offences against two girls and sentenced to thirteen years and two months' imprisonment. Fletcher gave evidence at the trial. Victims in the case were not identified at trial; Fletcher subsequently waived her anonymity and spoke publicly about the case. The case was reported to have contributed to changing attitudes towards reporting sexual abuse in the Haredi community, and prompted the Chief Rabbi, Ephraim Mirvis, to urge that allegations be reported to the police. Grynhaus was released on licence in 2022 and recalled to prison later that year for breaching his licence conditions.

== Chutzpah ==
Fletcher's memoir, Chutzpah: A Memoir of Faith, Sexuality and Daring to Stay, was published by Transworld in May 2025. The book recounts her upbringing, the abuse she experienced and her decision to remain within the Charedi community. Reviewing it for The Times Literary Supplement, Toby Lichtig called it "delightfully written: wry, moving, controlled, with a great instinct for pace and telling detail". Jennifer Lipman in The Jewish Chronicle described Fletcher as a rebel "who had every reason to leave her community, but who chose to stay", and Karen Skinazi, writing in the Jewish Journal, discussed the book as the story of a Haredi, queer role model.

A German edition, (K)eine von euch. Mein Leben als Rebellin in der orthodoxen Welt, translated by Erica Fischer, was published by Piper in 2025. The book was longlisted for the 2026 Wingate Literary Prize.

== Personal life ==
Fletcher lives in Prestwich, Greater Manchester. She has said that she deliberately remains within the Charedi community, and she identifies as a lesbian. As of 2025, she was studying for a master's degree.
