= Nahamu =

British think-tank

- Formation: 2019; 7 years ago
- Type: think tank
- Fields: Haredi Judaism, counter-extremism, human rights
- Leader: Yehudis Fletcher
- Website: Nahamu.org

Nahamu ("Comfort") is a British think-tank which campaigns against what it considers extremism in the Haredi Jewish community. It was founded in 2019 by several people concerned that coercive practices in the Haredi community were being ignored due to secular concerns around cultural sensitivity.

Nahamu acts as a thinktank aiming to engage policy-makers and influence both government and community leaders in areas such as forced marriage and safeguarding practices in community institutions. It works with other organisations such as Mavar and Gesher EU to assist Haredi Jews who wish to leave the community, but primarily seeks to improve the living conditions and welfare of Jewish people who choose to remain in their existing communities. Founder Yehudis Fletcher, who continues to identify as culturally Haredi, has stated, "I'm not threatening to leave [the Haredi community], I'm threatening to stay."

== History ==
There are approximately 75,000 Haredi Jews in Britain, mainly located in London, Manchester, and Gateshead, with smaller communities establishing themselves in Canvey Island, and Westcliff, both in Essex. An interlinked series of institutions and affiliated groups with shared values, rather than a single denomination, Haredi Jews are characterised by their strict adherence to their interpretation of Jewish law and a rejection of secularism. Although the Haredim have been living in Britain since the nineteenth century (the Union of Orthodox Hebrew Congregations being founded in 1926), Haredi population was boosted substantially by refugees from, and survivors of, Soviet persecution and the Holocaust. Absence of intermarriage, coupled with both a high birth and retention rate, spur rapid growth of the Haredi population, which is on pace to more than double every 20 years. Haredi Jews are currently 25% of the Jewish population in the UK, and are projected to form 40% by 2040, according to research by the Institute for Jewish Policy Research.

An insular religious community with a long history of persecution, the Haredi Jewish community has been subject to criticism for its reluctance to engage with UK laws and regulations, in particular in regards to their approach to education, women's rights, children's rights, and religious coercion. Efforts to engage the Haredi community on these subjects are often met with public protests and allegations of anti-Semitism.

Nahamu was co-founded by Yehudis Fletcher and Eve Sacks and other Jews. The daughter of a rabbi, Yehudis Fletcher grew up in the Haredi community, and was married into the Satmar order at the age of 18. Fletcher said she realised she was a victim of forced marriage after posting to Mumsnet. After several years of her reports of sexual abuse by her teacher, Todros Grynhaus, being ignored by authorities, her testimony in court led to his conviction and sentencing to thirteen years in prison in May 2015. Eve Sacks, a feminist campaigner who co-founded the UK branch of the Jewish Orthodox Feminist Alliance, met Yehudis at a Jewish event, having long been concerned by her interactions the restrictions on the lives of her Haredi schoolfriends growing up. In 2019, they launched Nahamu as an organisation advised by Adam Wagner, a Jewish human rights lawyer, and Rashad Ali, a former Islamist and anti-religious extremism campaigner. Their initial board of directors included David Taube, a barrister and director of policy at the Quilliam Foundation, and Daniel Jonas, a Jewish cultural figure and counter-extremism advocate.

Nahamu has five areas of focus:

- Forced marriage
- Sexual abuse
- Denial of education
- Coerced criminality
- Personal autonomy

In addition to its challenge to the Haredi institutional frameworks, Nahamu also aims to defend the Haredi community and way of life from discrimination and prejudice in the mainstream media and the Jewish community itself. Haredi community leaders have been critical of Nahamu, calling it a "secularist 'Jewish' group" and "hostile campaigners against the Chareidi kehillah". Nahamu responded that "We have never and would never attack shechita and milah ... Like all Orthodox Jews, we believe that Torah study and the observance of mitzvot are utterly central to the future of our community. We do not believe Jewish people should be coerced or bullied into our lifestyle choices. We believe that everyone is entitled to protection from harassment and abuse of any sort."

== Forced marriage ==
In 2021, Nahamu published a position paper with the Institute for Jewish Policy Research. The paper differentiates between arranged marriage and forced marriages, that Nahamu had no concerns regarding arranged marriages where both partners were consenting to the arrangement which often "has brought joy, satisfaction and belonging to many Jewish couples and enriched their lives"."

The position paper was welcomed by some campaigners and Jewish figures. The Haredi community reacted negatively, with Chaya Spitz, the CEO of the Interlink Foundation, condemning Nahamu as "stigmatising ultra-Orthodox marriage", and engaging with Yehudis Fletcher on a number of media platforms to discuss the views of Haredi leaders. Boris Johnson, the British prime minister, released a statement that forced marriage is "despicable".

The paper made a number of recommendations for legislative change, including:

- Prohibiting marriages under the age of 18
- Prohibiting religious marriages without a civil marriage
- Adding forced marriages to the mandatory RSE curriculum
- Engaging with Haredi leaders around the law and forced marriage.
- Producing guidance on the distinction between a legal arranged marriage and an illegal forced marriage in Hebrew and Yiddish.

Although Nahamu acknowledge that arranged marriages are not illegal, the five criteria they identify in the report to indicate a forced marriage - limited ability to object, a rushed engagement, restricted and supervised opportunities for the couple to speak before the wedding, and financial penalties in the event the wedding does not go ahead - are argued in the paper to apply to nearly all marriages in some Haredi communities. Chaya Spitz challenged this on BBC Woman's Hour, saying that "Anyone in the community looking at this document will just baulk and feel it is very far removed from the lived reality of ordinary people."

The British government subsequently translated their pamphlet on forced marriage into Yiddish in response to these concerns.

Eve Sacks noted in an interview with Pink News on the release of the paper that during their research for the paper, many forced marriages that they investigated were for LGBTQ+ people and were seen by some in the community as a form of conversion therapy. Due to the closely managed educational and information environment within the Haredi community, LGBTQ Haredi Jews often have no language or framework for understanding their feelings or experiences, as "their only point of reference for marriage is these arranged marriages".

== Sexual abuse ==
Nahamu has been condemnatory about the lack of safeguarding procedures within Haredi Jewish community institutions which do not protect ordinary congregants from prominent figures in the community who wield significant institutional power over individuals. The Independent Inquiry into Child Sex Abuse noted in its final report that at the time of its hearings in the late 2010s, the Union of Hebrew Congregations did not have a child protection policy at all.

In 2022, Rabbi Chaim Halpern, a well known public figure in the Golders Green Haredi community was accused of sexual abuse by a 22 year old woman on a programme by Channel 12, an Israeli TV programme. The subsequent investigation by the Metropolitan Police were closed after they were unable to identify the victim. Yehudis Fletcher stated to the Jewish News:

"While this outcome is disappointing, it was inevitable. The police had no new complainant and there was therefore nothing to propel an investigation forward. Because the police did not secure the trust of the victim who made the allegations in the TV broadcast, the investigation was over before it began. The scandal is actually not about an individual, but rather about a community that actively prevents us from reporting abuse, keeps us in vicelike control to stop us from realising we can get help from the outside world, and crushes all dissent."

Rabbi Halpern was later arrested and has a trial date set for 2025. Halpern resigned from his position within the Union of Orthodox Hebrew Congregations but continues to act as a communal rabbi in Golders Green, despite condemnations from local dayanim.

=== Get refusal ===
Another area of Nahamu's concern is that of get refusal in the Haredi community. A get is a divorce document that according to Jewish law, must be given voluntarily from a husband to a wife. Orthodox Jewish communities around the world have struggled with domestic abusers taking advantage of Jewish divorce laws and engaging in get refusal. A Jewish woman cannot remarry without a get and this can be weaponised by men who can deny the get, either to prevent the woman from remarrying or in order to extort her for money or custody rights. Get refusal is a form of abuse

Orthodox Jewish beth dins have strongly disagreed on how to tackle this problem, with some delegitimising any attempts to use legal or social measures to persuade get refusers to issue a get. In 2021, the Federation of Synagogues, a London-based Jewish organisation for 26 synagogues, released a statement refusing to recognise a get issued to a woman who had prosecuted her husband for new provisions criminalising 'coercive and controlling behaviour' under the Domestic Abuse Act. The Federation argued that this would constitute duress and invalidate any get. Along with the Chief Rabbi, the London Beth Din and Jewish Women's Aid, Yehudis Fletcher strongly condemned this decision, and commented on behalf of Nehamu that "'dysfunction and misogyny" were at the "root of all [the Federation's] reasoning", and that get refusal was much higher than estimated by the rabbinical courts as, "those women who have received a get have paid through the nose for it. Most of my friends who have a get have paid cash sums for it, ranging between giving up their equity in the [family] house to £10,000 in an envelope." The Federation subsequently withdrew its previous position and announced it would hold further conversations about using the new legislation to aid victims of abuse, with Nahamu welcoming the change but noting "This is a good starting point, but it is just that, and nothing more. I would expect to see solid action points in the coming weeks that signify they are serious about this opportunity to stop their alienation of victims of abuse."

=== Sexual abuse of children ===
Nahamu also links the problem with unregulated educational institutions with sexual abuse with the Haredi community. Following the release of the Independent Inquiry into Child Sex Abuse (IICSA) in 2021, Yehudis Fletcher explained to The Times that the report demonstrated, "an absolute link between sexual abuse and other abuse an unregistered settings. Referencing her own experience as a victim of sexual abuse by her school teacher Todros Gryhaus, Fletcher commented, "If you can't make sure that no one is hurting children, you may as well nail a sign to the door that says it OK to abuse children here because no-one is going to find out. It creates a haven for child abuse." The IICSA cited Todros Grynhaus as a case study in the report, with rabbis in the community offering one of his victims £5,000 compensation and advising her that it was a sin to report Grynhaus to the police. Grynhaus was later convicted of sexual abuse of two teenage girls and sentenced to thirteen years in prison.

== Denial of education ==
The lack of secular education available within the Haredi community has been a major plank of Nahamu's work programme since launch. Fletcher herself attended an unregistered school that was based on the top floor of her family's synagogue. Her own children attended King David High School in Manchester, a mainstream Jewish faith school which Fletcher also criticised for poor safeguarding practice.

Nahamu was involved in supporting a campaign to include measures against unregistered Haredi schools in a government education bill which was outlined in a Queen's Speech in 2022. However, after a chaotic period in British politics, these measures were later dropped following Rishi Sunak becoming prime minister. Shortly after these proposed changes were dropped, The Times conducted an secret investigation, supported by Nahamu, into the state of education with the Haredi community. The investigative report described widespread use of loopholes in British law to provide inadequate education in poorly provisioned classrooms, significant safeguarding breaches and use of violence to discipline children, and educational outcomes which often left children illiterate in English and without any basic qualifications. Yehudis Fletcher explained in an accompanying op-ed in the Times: "The aborted plans in parts 3 and 4 of the Schools Bill would have gone some way towards confirming that yeshivas are indeed schools. They would then have been registrable and inspectable. They would have strengthened Ofsted's powers to collect evidence in suspected unregistered schools, and created a register for children supposedly educated "at home". This would have been a good start in terms of holding the community to account for the hitherto secretive education of its children."

In September 2024, Nahamu published their second position paper, on the Haredi school system, and calling for greater regulation and for illegal private educational institutions in the Haredi community to be shut down. With a foreword written by Labour peers Baroness Estelle Morris and Baroness Tessa Blackstone, both former education ministers, Nahamu hoped to influence the upcoming Child Welfare Bill proposed by the new Labour government. The paper calls for:

- All schools to be registered and subject to Ofsted inspections with loopholes closed by primary legislation.
- Enforcement of English and maths provision in Haredi schools including independently invigilated testing to ensure subjects are taught all year round.
- A register of homeschooled children that could be checked for access to appropriate curriculum.
- Enforcement of education from ages of 16-18, as many Haredi schools end at Year 10.
- Enforcement of the provision of relationship and sex education within Haredi schools.

Rabbi Jonathan Romain, a leading Reform rabbi in the UK, welcomed the paper as "shin[ing] a light on British Jewry's dark secret. The National Secular Society also publicised the paper and called for greater regulation of unregistered religious schools.

In response to the position paper, Chinuch UK, a Haredi campaign group to defend the Haredi schools system, described the report as "disappointing". "There is much excellent work happening in Charedi schools, of which the community is rightly proud. Where there are weaknesses, as there are across all parts of the education sector, Chinuch UK and our partners work actively with schools to improve standards." The Jewish Chronicle cited one anonymous Haredi critic as saying, "one of the most ironic aspects of the report is that it portrays the Charedi community as controlling and dictating how people should live their lives, yet it goes on to recommend government intervention to impose changes on the Charedi way of life." The British Rabbinical Union wrote to the Catharine McKinnon MP, Minister for Schools Standards, to condemn the position paper and Nahamu as presenting a "distorted view of Haredi education and exhibits hostility to our way of life." The BRU response also noted that demand for Haredi schools had increased by 136% between 1990 and 2016, and argued that Haredi parents would not send their children to Haredi schools if they were not being educated there.

== Personal autonomy ==
In 2021, Yehudis Fletcher challenged Jewish comedian David Baddiel, who had posted disparaging comments about the Haredi community following reports of widespread disregard of COVID-19 lockdown regulations. Fletcher argued that the Haredi community is often "othered" by mainstream Jewry, but they are as much a part of the British Jewish community as secular Jews like Baddiel, and their concerns should be taken seriously. Baddiel and Fletcher's dialogue on Twitter resulted in a public debate at JW3 that was streamed online and attended by over 1,000 people.

As part of their comments on the Bloom Review, an independent review of government interactions with faith communities, Nahamu made a statement welcoming the recommendations, particular on forced marriage and religious education, but also on the need to protect the Haredi community from external groups seeking to disrupt them, citing Black Hebrew Israelite demonstrations that had targeted the Haredi community.

Nahamu has been critical of the impact of the Hasidic community's policy against allowing women to drive. Yehudis Fletcher noted in a column for Jewish News that, "Even if her husband is open to her driving; both husband and wife will be aware that a breach of social norms will have consequences; soft shunning in the synagogue, children denied places at school, and the family downgraded for shidduchim [marriage matches]." Yehudis Fletcher has previously written of her frustration that secular society and many who consider themselves progressive will tolerate abuse within insular religious communities because this is the culture: "As a Haredi woman, I have found that in both my personal and professional life, some people think the answer is no. Feminists are so afraid of 'colonizing' a community with ideas alien to it, that they are content leaving the women inside that community ineligible for the feminist project. What they don't realize is that Haredi Judaism isn't unique or special in the way women within it experience oppression."

== See also ==
- Mavar - British Jewish organisation helping Haredi Jews who want to leave their communities
- Off the derech - Jewish term for former Orthodox / Haredi Jews who become irreligious
- Get refusal - abuse of Jewish religious laws of divorce
