= Digital Economy Act 2017 =

UK law regulating digital media

Digital Economy Act 2017 (Note: Section 120.)
- Act of Parliament
- Parliament of the United Kingdom
- Long title: An Act to make provision about electronic communications infrastructure and services; to provide for restricting access to online pornography; to make provision about protection of intellectual property in connection with electronic communications; to make provision about data sharing; to make provision in connection with section 68 of the Telecommunications Act 1984; to make provision about functions of OFCOM in relation to the BBC; to provide for determination by the BBC of age-related TV licence fee concessions; to make provision about the regulation of direct marketing; to make other provision about OFCOM and its functions; to make provision about internet filters; to make provision about preventing or restricting the use of communication devices in connection with drug dealing offences; to confer power to create an offence of breaching limits on ticket sales; to make provision about the payment of charges to the Information Commissioner; to make provision about payment systems and securities settlement systems; to make provision about qualifications in information technology; and for connected purposes.
- Citation: 2017 c. 30
- Introduced by: John Whittingdale (Commons); Henry Ashton, 4th Baron Ashton of Hyde (Lords)
- Territorial extent: England and Wales (in part); Scotland (in part); Northern Ireland (in part); (Note: Section 119.)

Dates
- Royal assent: 27 April 2017
- Commencement: Various (Note: Section 118.)
Other legislation
Amends	Registered Designs Act 1949; Registration Service Act 1953; Landlord and Tenant Act 1954; Opencast Coal Act 1958; Land Drainage Act (Scotland) Act 1958; Pipe-lines Act 1962; Harbours Act 1964; Fair Trading Act 1973; House of Commons Disqualification Act 1975; Public Lending Right Act 1979; Highways Act 1980; Telecommunications Act 1984; Roads (Scotland) Act 1984; Housing Act 1985; Food and Environment Protection Act 1985; Airports Act 1986; Landlord and Tenant Act 1987; Copyright, Designs and Patents Act 1988; Road Traffic (Driver Licensing and Information Systems) Act 1989; Electricity Act 1989; Town and Country Planning Act 1990; Water Industry Act 1991; Water Resources Act 1991; Electricity (Northern Ireland) Order 1992; Cardiff Bay Barrage Act 1993; Roads (Northern Ireland) Order 1993; Airports (Northern Ireland) Order 1994; Landlord and Tenant (Covenants) Act 1995; Gas Act 1995; Broadcasting Act 1996; Scotland Act 1998; Channel Tunnel Rail Link Act 1996; Gas (Northern Ireland) Order 1996; Business Tenancies (Northern Ireland) Order 1996; Town and Country Planning (Scotland) Act 1997; Data Protection Act 1998; Financial Services and Markets Act 2000; Office of Communications Act 2002; Enterprise Act 2002; Communications Act 2003; Land Reform (Scotland) Act 2003; Copyright and Related Rights Regulations 2003; High Court Enforcement Officers Regulations 2004; Wireless Telegraphy Act 2006; Statistics and Registration Service Act 2007; Housing and Regeneration Act 2008; Crossrail Act 2008; Banking Act 2009; Apprenticeships, Skills, Children and Learning Act 2009; Digital Economy Act 2010; Marine (Scotland) Act 2010; Postal Services Act 2011; Scotland Act 2012; Financial Services Act 2012; Financial Services (Banking Reform) Act 2013; Serious Crime Act 2015; Consumer Rights Act 2015; Deregulation Act 2015
Amended by	Data Protection Act 2018; Digital Government (Disclosure of Information) Regulations 2018; Digital Government (Welsh Bodies) (Wales) Regulations 2018; Digital Government (Scottish Bodies) Regulations 2018; Higher Education and Research Act 2017 (Further Implementation etc.) Regulations 2019; Sentencing Act 2020; Health and Social Care (Quality and Engagement) (Wales) Act 2020; Transfer of Functions (Digital Government) Order 2020; Product Security and Telecommunications Infrastructure Act 2022; Criminal Justice Act 2003 (Commencement No. 33) and Sentencing Act 2020 (Commencement No. 2) Regulations 2022; Online Safety Act 2023; Levelling-up and Regeneration Act 2023; Secretaries of State for Energy Security and Net Zero, for Science, Innovation and Technology, for Business and Trade, and for Culture, Media and Sport and the Transfer of Functions (National Security and Investment Act 2021 etc) Order 2023; Judicial Review and Courts Act 2022 (Magistrates’ Court Sentencing Powers) Regulations 2023; Media Act 2024; Transfer of Functions (Secretary of State for Housing, Communities and Local Government) Order 2024; Digital Government (Disclosure of Information) (Identity Verification Services) Regulations 2024; Water (Special Measures) Act 2025; Data (Use and Access) Act 2025
Relates to	Digital Economy Act 2010

Status: Amended

History of passage through Parliament

Text of statute as originally enacted

Revised text of statute as amended

The Digital Economy Act 2017 (c. 30) is an act of the Parliament of the United Kingdom. It is substantially different from, and shorter than, the Digital Economy Act 2010, whose provisions largely ended up not being passed into law. The act addresses policy issues related to electronic communications infrastructure and services, and updates the conditions for and sentencing of criminal copyright infringement. It was introduced to Parliament by culture secretary John Whittingdale on 5 July 2016. Whittingdale was replaced as culture secretary by Karen Bradley on 14 July 2016. The act received royal assent on 27 April 2017.

== Provisions ==
The provisions of the act include:

- Allowing data sharing between government departments in order to provide Digital Government.
- Creating a UK age-verification regulator to publish guidelines about how pornographic websites which operate "on a commercial basis" should ensure their users are aged 18 or older. The regulator would be empowered to fine those who fail to comply up to £250,000 (or up to 5% of their turnover), to order the blocking of non-compliant websites, and to require those providing financial or advertising services to non-compliant websites to cease doing so. The regulator's proposals have to be approved three months before coming into effect. The BBFC was commissioned to fulfil the regulatory role but the introduction of the scheme was subject to multiple delays. It was expected to begin in 2018 but was delayed until spring 2019, then to July 2019, and then for a further period in the region of six months. In October 2019, the culture secretary Nicky Morgan stated that the government had abandoned the mandate altogether, in favour of replacing it with a forthcoming wider scheme of Internet regulation.
- Requiring Internet service providers to use Internet filters to block all websites that have adult content, unless customers have opted out.
- Introducing a Universal Service Obligation which allows users to request broadband speeds of at least 10 Mbps. The obligation is to be introduced by 2020, and Ofcom are empowered to subsequently increase the minimum broadband speed requirement.
- Requiring Internet service providers to provide compensation to customers if service requirements are not met.
- Allowing Ofcom, the communications sector's regulator, to financially penalise communications providers for failing to comply with licence commitments.
- Requiring mobile telephony providers to offer a contract cap to customers limiting monthly spending to an agreed figure.
- Providing for increased penalties for nuisance calls.
- Updating the Ofcom Electronic Communications Code to make it easier for telecommunications companies to erect and extend mobile masts.
- Extending Public Lending Right to remotely lent e-books (section 31 of the Act).
- Modifying the Copyright, Designs and Patents Act 1988 to raise the maximum sentence for Internet copyright infringement to 10 years in prison, and allowing English and Welsh courts a greater range of sentencing options in such cases.
- Modifying the Copyright, Designs and Patents Act 1988 to allow public service broadcasters to charge retransmission fees.
- Giving Ofcom oversight of the BBC as its external regulator.
- Empowering Ofcom to require public service broadcasters to include a minimum quantity of children's programming made in the United Kingdom.

== Timetable ==
The bill completed its passage through the House of Commons during the Autumn of 2016. It then moved to the House of Lords. Royal assent was achieved by the end of Spring 2017. The final stages of the legislative process occurred during the wash-up period before the 2017 general election, as was the case with the Digital Economy Act 2010 which completed its course through Parliament during the wash-up before the 2010 general election.

== Amendments ==
- An amendment to the bill making it an offence to use "digital purchasing software" to purchase an excessive number of event tickets for ticket resale was withdrawn at the committee stage. However, a subsequent amendment giving the government the power to create a new criminal offence of using Internet bots to bypass limits on maximum ticket purchases set by event organisers was included in the final bill, with offenders potentially subject to unlimited fines, and this came into force in July 2018.
- An amendment to the bill was put forward making it an offence to publish or host on-line footage or photographs in cases where the distributors "knew or ought to have known" that it "involved exploited persons". The amendment was subsequently withdrawn.
- An amendment to the bill was tabled clarifying the employment rights of workers for digital services such as Uber.
- An amendment to the bill was tabled by the shadow minister for digital economy Louise Haigh, extending the legal obligation on television broadcasters to include subtitles, sign language and audio description when providing video on demand. A government amendment to the same effect was subsequently published by the minister responsible for digital policy Matthew Hancock and became part of the act.
- An amendment requiring the universal prominence of public service broadcasters in digital television electronic program guides was modified so that the act as passed requires Ofcom to report in 2020 on how such prominence can be ensured in the context of greater on-demand viewing.
- In October 2016 a clause entitled: "Power to provide for a code of practice related to copyright infringement" was proposed after a lobbying campaign led by copyright holders. The amendment would have required search engines to de-list sites linked to piracy from their search results. It would also have granted the government powers to investigate and sanction search engine operators for failure to comply. The clause was not included in the final act.
- In November 2016, following pressure from MPs, the government proposed an amendment to the bill to allow the age verification regulator to require internet service providers to block pornographic websites that do not offer age verification. As the BBFC were expected to become the regulator, this caused discussion about ISPs being required to block content that is prohibited even under an R18 certificate, the prohibition of some of which is itself controversial.
- An amendment in the House of Lords raising the Universal Service Obligation for broadband to 30 Mbps was abandoned as being too ambitious.

Although privacy and technical safeguards for the sharing of citizens' data are not included in the act, the government stated that it intended to publish codes of practice following a public consultation. The consultation took place in the Autumn of 2017.

== Reaction ==
Open Rights Group (ORG), a digital rights campaigning organisation, raised concerns over aspects of the Bill. The provisions for the age verification of pornographic website users raised concerns about the privacy implications of collecting user data, and the possible ineffectiveness of a method focused on restricting payments to pornographic websites. Myles Jackman, ORG's legal director, highlighted the potential vulnerability of age verification systems to hacking, and suggested that it would result in more people using virtual private networks, or anonymous web browsers such as Tor. A public consultation on the BBFC's draft guidance to age verification service providers began in March 2018. The age verification provisions were due to come into effect in April 2018, were delayed until the end of 2018 and then further delayed until spring 2019. In March 2019 the BBFC published its guidance, and draft regulations – the Online Pornography (Commercial Basis) Regulations 2019 – were produced for approval by Parliament. The UK government stated in April 2019 that it planned to introduce mandatory age verification on 15 July 2019. In June 2019 the Culture Secretary, Jeremy Wright, announced that the implementation of the law had again been postponed for a period in the region of six months.

ORG also raised concerns over the risk of misuse of bulk data sharing. The provisions regarding copyright infringements were criticised for the vagueness of the definition and the severity of the maximum sentence (10 years in prison). BILETA, the British and Irish Law, Education and Technology Association, also criticised the proposal to increase maximum jail term in its submission to the Government's consultation. The proposal was described as 'unacceptable', 'unaffordable', and 'infeasible'. It has been suggested that this provision may be intended to dissuade users of technology such as Kodi software from downloading content that breaches copyright regulations.

A number of expert witnesses to the Digital Economy Bill Committee expressed concerns about the bill. Jerry Fishenden, co-chair of the Cabinet Office’s Privacy and Consumer Advisory Group until he resigned in protest on 2 May 2017, expressed the opinion that the bill was based on an "obsolete" model of data sharing. He commented: "I find it surprising the bill doesn’t have definition of what data sharing is, both practically and legally… I’d like to see some precision around what’s meant by data sharing. The lack of detail is concerning." He also said that the bill "appears to weaken citizens’ control over their personal data", something that is "likely to undermine trust in government and make citizens less willing to share their personal data".

David Kaye, a special rapporteur for the United Nations, wrote an open letter to the UK government in 2017, raising concerns about the bill. Kaye questioned the legality of the proposed framework in relation to the International Covenant on Civil and Political Rights.

Jeni Tennison, CEO of the Open Data Institute, commented on the lack of transparency regarding existing public sector data sharing agreements and how the bill's measures fit with them. She spoke of her belief that the bill lacks the transparency needed to avoid the kind of problems that arose with NHS Digital's abandoned Care.data programme. Mike Bracken, chief digital officer at the Co-operative Group and former head of the Government Digital Service, expressed the opinion that "the government relies on bulk data sets too often, instead of simply asking for the individual data set pertaining to the information needed". The civil liberties and privacy advocacy group Big Brother Watch told the committee said that bill overlooked the work of the Government Digital Service in setting up the GOV.UK Verify scheme, a model based on the government not centrally storing data.

The Conservative Party manifesto commitment to introduce age verification followed the publication of research into children viewing pornography online that was commissioned by the NSPCC. The polling agency that carried out the research, OnePoll, has been criticised for the techniques it used, raising questions about the quality of the resulting data. For instance, the company offered a questionnaire to children aged 11–16 despite its own terms and conditions of use stating that users must be at least 16 years old.

== Non-implementation of age verification ==
In October 2019, Nicky Morgan MP said that the government had shelved plans to introduce age verification checks for Internet pornography. Four age verification providers subsequently launched legal action to force the government to bring in the porn age ban in January 2020, a move that was supported by children's charities. Their argument that there is accepted legal precedent that a government cannot pass a law, secure royal assent for it and then frustrate the will of Parliament by deciding not to introduce it saw them win permission in July 2020 for a judicial review.

The government announced in October 2020 its intention to repeal part 3 of the act, which contains the age verification mandate. Clause 131 of the government's draft Online Safety Bill, published in May 2021, gave effect to this intention. Addressing the House of Commons DCMS Select Committee, the Secretary of State, Rt. Hon. Oliver Dowden MP confirmed he would be happy to consider a proposal during pre-legislative scrutiny of the Online Safety Bill by a joint committee of both Houses of Parliament to extend the scope of the bill to all commercial pornographic websites.

== See also ==
- Investigatory Powers Act 2016
- Proposed UK Internet age verification system
- Gigabit Infrastructure Act, contains similar land access powers in relation to broadband infrastructure
