= List of statutory instruments of the United Kingdom, 2019 =

These are a list of statutory instruments made in the United Kingdom in the year 2019. 1,409 statutory instruments were implemented that year.

== 1–100 ==
Number	Title
1	The International Driving Permits (Fees) (EU Exit) Regulations 2019
2	The A55 & A494 Trunk roads (East of St David's Interchange to Pinfold Lane, Ewloe, Flintshire) (Temporary Traffic Prohibitions & Restriction) Order 2019 (Note: This Order was also implemented in Welsh as Gorchymyn Cefnffyrdd yr A55 a’r A494 (Man i’r Dwyrain o Gyfnewidfa Dewi Sant i Pinfold Lane, Ewloe, Sir y Fflint) (Gwaharddiadau a Chyfyngiad Traffig Dros Dro) 2019)
3	The A458 Trunk Road (East of Middletown to Nant-y-Dugoed, Powys) (Temporary Speed Restrictions & No Overtaking) Order 2019 (Note: This Order was also implemented in Welsh as Gorchymyn Cefnffordd yr A458 (Man i'r Dwyrain o Dreberfedd i Nant-y-dugoed, Powys) (Cyfyngiadau Cyflymder Dros Dro a Dim Goddiweddyd) 2019)
4	The Blood Safety and Quality (Amendment) (EU Exit) Regulations 2019
5	The Weights and Measures etc. (Miscellaneous) (Amendment) Regulations 2019
6	The Protocol 1 to the EEA Agreement (Amendment) (EU Exit) Regulations 2019
7	The A489 Trunk Road (Newtown to Caersws, Powys) (Temporary Speed Restrictions & No Overtaking) Order 2019 (Note: This Order was also implemented in Welsh as Gorchymyn Cefnffordd yr A489 (Y Drenewydd i Gaersws, Powys) (Cyfyngiadau Cyflymder Dros Dro a Dim Goddiweddyd) 2019)
8	The A470 Trunk Road (Llangurig, Powys to Mallwyd, Gwynedd) (Temporary Speed Restrictions & No Overtaking) Order 2019 (Note: This Order was also implemented in Welsh as Gorchymyn Cefnffordd yr A470 (Llangurig, Powys i Fallwyd, Gwynedd) (Cyfyngiadau Cyflymder Dros Dro a Dim Goddiweddyd) 2019)
9	The Diocese of Lincoln (Educational Endowments) (Navenby Church of England School) Order 2019
10	The Universal Credit (Transitional Provisions) (SDP Gateway) Amendment Regulations 2019
11	The Council Tax Reduction Schemes (Prescribed Requirements and Default Scheme) (Wales) (Amendment) Regulations 2019 (Note: This Order was also implemented in Welsh as Rheoliadau Cynlluniau Gostyngiadau’r Dreth Gyngor (Gofynion Rhagnodedig a’r Cynllun Diofyn) (Cymru) (Diwygio) 2019)
12	The Infrastructure Planning (Water Resources) (England) Order 2019
13	The Excise Goods (Holding, Movement and Duty Point) (Amendment etc.) (EU Exit) Regulations 2019
14	The Excise Duties (Miscellaneous Amendments) (EU Exit) Regulations 2019
15	The Excise Duties (Miscellaneous Amendments) (EU Exit) (No. 2) Regulations 2019
16	The Leghold Trap and Pelt Imports (Amendment etc.) (EU Exit) Regulations 2019
17	The A44 Trunk Road (Llangurig, Powys to Aberystwyth, Ceredigion) (Temporary Speed Restrictions & No Overtaking) Order 2019 (Note: This Order was also implemented in Welsh as Gorchymyn Cefnffordd yr A44 (Llangurig, Powys i Aberystwyth, Ceredigion) (Cyfyngiadau Cyflymder Dros Dro a Dim Goddiweddyd) 2019)
18	The Spring Traps Approval (Wales) Order 2019 (Note: This Order was also implemented in Welsh as Gorchymyn Cefnffordd yr A44 (Llangurig, Powys i Aberystwyth, Ceredigion) (Cyfyngiadau Cyflymder Dros Dro a Dim Goddiweddyd) 2019)
19	The A470 Trunk Road (Builth Wells to Llangurig, Powys) (Temporary Speed Restrictions & No Overtaking) Order 2019 (Note: This Order was also implemented in Welsh as Gorchymyn Cefnffordd yr A470 (Llanfair-ym-Muallt i Langurig, Powys) (Cyfyngiadau Cyflymder Dros Dro a Dim Goddiweddyd) 2019)
20	The Holderness Offshore Marine Conservation Zone Designation Order 2019
21	The Horizon 2020 Framework Programme for Research and Innovation (EU Exit) Regulations 2019
22	The Humane Trapping Standards Regulations 2019
23	The Online Pornography (Commercial Basis) Regulations 2019
24	The Ionizing radiation (Environmental and Public Protection) (Miscellaneous Amendments) (EU Exit) Regulations 2019
25	The Environment, Food and Rural Affairs (Environmental Impact Assessment) (Amendment) (EU Exit) Regulations 2019
26	The Sanctions (Amendment) (EU Exit) Regulations 2019
27	The Universal Credit (Restriction on Amounts for Children and Qualifying Young Persons) (Transitional Provisions) Amendment Regulations 2019
29	The Finance Act 2004 (Standard Lifetime Allowance) Regulations 2019
30	The M4 motorway & A470 Trunk Road (Coryton Interchange, Cardiff to Cefn Coed Roundabout, Merthyr Tydfil) (Temporary Prohibition of Vehicles & Cyclists) Order 2019 (Note: This Order was also implemented in Welsh as Gorchymyn Traffordd yr M4 a Chefnffordd yr A470 (Cyfnewidfa Coryton, Caerdydd i Gylchfan Cefn Coed, Merthyr Tudful) (Gwahardd Cerbydau a Beicwyr Dros Dro) 2019)
31	The Drainage (Environmental Impact Assessment) (Amendment) (Northern Ireland) (EU Exit) Regulations 2019
32	The Water and Floods (Amendment) (Northern Ireland) (EU Exit) Regulations 2019
33	The A489 Trunk Road (Cemmaes Road to Machynlleth, Powys) (Temporary Speed Restrictions and No Overtaking) Order 2019 (Note: This Order was also implemented in Welsh as Gorchymyn Cefnffordd yr A489 (Glantwymyn i Fachynlleth, Powys) (Cyfyngiadau Cyflymder Dros Dro a Dim Goddiweddyd) 2019)
35	The Renewables Obligation (Amendment) (EU Exit) Regulations 2019
36	The Homes and Communities Agency (Transfer of Property etc.) Regulations 2019
37	The Welfare Reform Act 2012 (Commencement No. 31 and Savings and Transitional Provisions and Commencement No. 21 and 23 and Transitional and Transitory Provisions (Amendment)) Order 2019
38	The Credit Institutions and Insurance Undertakings Reorganisation and Winding Up (Amendment) (EU Exit) Regulations 2019
39	The Environmental Permitting (England and Wales) (Amendment) (EU Exit) Regulations 2019
40	The Plant Health (Ips typographus) (England) Order 2019
41	The Tobacco Products and Nicotine Inhaling Products (Amendment etc.) (EU Exit) Regulations 2019
42	The Merchant Shipping (Prevention of Oil Pollution) Regulations 2019
43	The Value Added Tax (Finance) (EU Exit) Order 2019
44	The Food for Specific Groups (Information and Compositional Requirements) (Amendment) (England) Regulations 2019
45	The A5 Trunk Road (Halton Roundabout, Chirk, Wrexham County Borough to Pentrefoelas, Conwy County Borough) (Temporary Traffic Prohibitions) Order 2019 (Note: This Order was also implemented in Welsh as Gorchymyn Cefnffordd yr A5 (Cylchfan Halton, Y Waun, Bwrdeistref Sirol Wrecsam i Bentrefoelas, Bwrdeistref Sirol Conwy) (Gwaharddiadau Traffig Dros Dro) 2019)
46	The A470 Trunk Road (Powys/Merthyr Tydfil County Boundary to Builth Wells, Powys) (Temporary Speed Restrictions & No Overtaking) Order 2019 (Note: This Order was also implemented in Welsh as Gorchymyn Cefnffordd yr A470 (Ffin Sirol Powys/Merthyr Tudful i Lanfair-ym-Muallt, Powys) (Cyfyngiadau Cyflymder Dros Dro a Dim Goddiweddyd) 2019)
47	The Statistics of Trade (Amendment etc.) (EU Exit) Regulations 2019
48	The A487 and A40 Trunk Roads (Fishguard, Pembrokeshire) (Temporary Traffic Prohibitions and Restrictions) Order 2019 (Note: This Order was also implemented in Welsh as Gorchymyn Cefnffyrdd yr A487 a’r A40 (Abergwaun, Sir Benfro) (Gwaharddiadau a Chyfyngiadau Traffig Dros Dro) 2019)
49	The Agricultural Holdings (Units of Production) (Wales) Order 2019 (Note: This Order was also implemented in Welsh as Gorchymyn Daliadau Amaethyddol (Unedau Cynhyrchu) (Cymru) 2019)
50	The Smoke Control Areas (Authorised Fuels) (Wales) Regulations 2019 (Note: This Order was also implemented in Welsh as Rheoliadau Ardaloedd Rheoli Mwg (Tanwyddau Awdurdodedig) (Cymru) 2019)
51	The Smoke Control Areas (Exempted Classes of Fireplace) (Wales) Order 2019 (Note: This Order was also implemented in Welsh as Gorchymyn Ardaloedd Rheoli Mwg (Dosbarthau Esempt ar Leoedd Tân) (Cymru) 2019)
52	The A55 Trunk Road (Junction 3 (Pencaledog Interchange) to Junction 4 (Dalar Hir Interchange), Isle of Anglesey) (Temporary Prohibition of Vehicles, Cyclists & Pedestrians) Order 2019 (Note: This Order was also implemented in Welsh as Gorchymyn Cefnffordd yr A55 (Cyffordd 3 (Cyfnewidfa Pencaledog) i Gyffordd 4 (Cyfnewidfa Dalar Hir), Ynys Môn) (Gwahardd Cerbydau, Beicwyr a Cherddwyr Dros Dro) 2019)
53	The A48 Trunk road (Cross Hands Roundabout to Pont Abraham Roundabout, Carmarthenshire) (Temporary Traffic Prohibitions and Restrictions) Order 2019 (Note: This Order was also implemented in Welsh as Gorchymyn Cefnffordd yr A48 (Cylchfan Cross Hands i Gylchfan Pont Abraham, Sir Gaerfyrddin) (Gwaharddiadau a Chyfyngiadau Traffig Dros Dro) 2019)
54	The A55 Trunk Road (Eastbound Carriageway between Junction 23 (Llanddulas) and Junction 24 (Faenol Interchange), Conwy County Borough) (Temporary Prohibition of Vehicles, Cyclists and Pedestrians) Order 2019 (Note: This Order was also implemented in Welsh as Gorchymyn Cefnffordd yr A55 (Y Gerbytffordd tua’r Dwyrain rhwng Cyffordd 23 (Llanddulas) a Chyffordd 24 (Cyfnewidfa’r Faenol), Bwrdeistref Sirol Conwy) (Gwahardd Cerbydau, Beicwyr a Cherddwyr Dros Dro) 2019)
55	The South Norfolk (Electoral Changes) Order 2019
56	The Leeds (Electoral Changes) Order 2019
57	The Equine Identification (Wales) Regulations 2019 (Note: This Order was also implemented in Welsh as Rheoliadau Adnabod Ceffylau (Cymru) 2019)
58	The A483 Trunk Road (Newtown to Llanymynech, Powys) (Temporary Speed Restrictions & No Overtaking) Order 2019 (Note: This Order was also implemented in Welsh as Gorchymyn Cefnffordd yr A483 (y Drenewydd i Lanymynech, Powys) (Cyfyngiadau Cyflymder Dros Dro a Dim Goddiweddyd) 2019)
59	The Value Added Tax (Miscellaneous Amendments and Revocations) (EU Exit) Regulations 2019
60	The Value Added Tax (Accounting Procedures for Import VAT for VAT Registered Persons and Amendment) (EU Exit) Regulations 2019
61	The Technical and Further Education Act 2017 (Commencement No. 5) Regulations 2019
62	The Human Medicines (Amendment) Regulations 2019
63	The Investment Allowance and Cluster Area Allowance (Relevant Income: Tariff Receipts) Regulations 2019
64	The South Oxfordshire (Electoral Changes) Order 2019
65	The Central Bedfordshire (Electoral Changes) Order 2019
66	The Mission and Pastoral etc. (Amendment) Measure 2018 (Commencement No. 3) Order 2019
67	The Church of England (Miscellaneous Provisions) Measure 2018 (Commencement) Order 2019
68	The Anti-social Behaviour, Crime and Policing Act 2014 (Amendment) Order 2019
69	The Taxation (Cross-border Trade) Act 2018 (Appointed Day No. 2) (EU Exit) Regulations 2019
70	The Food for Specific Groups (Information and Compositional Requirements) (Amendment) (Wales) Regulations 2019 (Note: This Order was also implemented in Welsh as Rheoliadau Bwyd ar gyfer Grwpiau Penodol (Gofynion o ran Gwybodaeth a Chyfansoddiad) (Diwygio) (Cymru) 2019)
72	The Animals (Scientific Procedures) Act 1986 (EU Exit) Regulations 2019
73	The Value Added Tax (Tour Operators) (Amendment) (EU Exit) Regulations 2019
74	The Air Quality (Amendment of Domestic Regulations) (EU Exit) Regulations 2019
75	The A55 Trunk Road (Pen-y-clip Tunnel, Conwy County Borough) (Temporary Traffic Prohibitions & Restrictions) Order 2019 (Note: This Order was also implemented in Welsh as Gorchymyn Cefnffordd yr A55 (Twnnel Pen-y-clip, Bwrdeistref Sirol Conwy) (Gwaharddiadau a Chyfyngiadau Traffig Dros Dro) 2019)
76	The Zoonotic disease Eradication and Control (Amendment) (Northern Ireland) (EU Exit) Regulations 2019
77	The European Research Infrastructure Consortium (Amendment) (EU Exit) Regulations 2019
78	The Air Navigation (Restriction of Flying) (Royal International Air Tattoo, Royal Air Force Fairford) Regulations 2019
79	The Air Navigation (Restriction of Flying) (Old Warden) Regulations 2019
80	The Air Navigation (Restriction of Flying) (Cheltenham Festival) Regulations 2019
81	The Air Navigation (Restriction of Flying) (Hardendale) (Emergency) Regulations 2019
82	The Railways (Access, Management and Licensing of Railway Undertakings) (Amendment) Regulations 2019
83	The Income Tax (Pay As You Earn) (Amendment) Regulations 2019
85	The Social Security (Contributions) (Amendment) Regulations 2019
86	The Town and Country Planning (Manston Airport) Special Development Order 2019
87	The Electronic Commerce (Amendment etc.) (EU Exit) Regulations 2019
88	The Genetically modified organisms (Amendment) (England) (EU Exit) Regulations 2019
89	The Electronic Identification and Trust Services for Electronic Transactions (Amendment etc.) (EU Exit) Regulations 2019
90	The Genetically Modified Organisms (Amendment) (EU Exit) Regulations 2019
91	The Value Added Tax and Excise Personal Reliefs (Special Visitors and Goods Permanently Imported) (Amendment) (EU Exit) Regulations 2019
92	The Livestock (Records, Identification and Movement) (Miscellaneous Amendments) (Wales) (EU Exit) Regulations 2019 (Note: This Order was also implemented in Welsh as Rheoliadau Da Byw (Cofnodion, Adnabod a Symud) (Diwygiadau Amrywiol) (Cymru) (Ymadael â’r UE) 2019)
93	The Competition (Amendment etc.) (EU Exit) Regulations 2019
94	The Animal By-Products and Transmissible Spongiform Encephalopathies (Miscellaneous Amendments) (Wales) (EU Exit) Regulations 2019 (Note: This Order was also implemented in Welsh as Rheoliadau Sgil-gynhyrchion Anifeiliaid ac Enseffalopathïau Sbyngffurf Trosglwyddadwy (Diwygiadau Amrywiol) (Cymru) (Ymadael â’r UE) 2019)
95	The A494 Trunk Road (Queensferry Interchange, Flintshire) (Temporary Prohibition of Vehicles, Cyclists & Pedestrians) Order 2019 (Note: This Order was also implemented in Welsh as Gorchymyn Cefnffordd yr A494 (Cyfnewidfa Queensferry, Sir y Fflint) (Gwahardd Cerbydau, Beicwyr a Cherddwyr Dros Dro) 2019)
96	The Control of Mercury (Amendment) (EU Exit) Regulations 2019
97	The Church Property Measure 2018 (Commencement) Order 2019
98	The Church of England Pensions Measure 2018 (Commencement and Savings) Order 2019
99	The Ecumenical Relations Measure 2018 (Commencement) Order 2019
100	The Fertilisers (Amendment) (Northern Ireland) (EU Exit) Regulations 2019

== 101–200 ==
Number	Title
101	The Council Tax and Non-Domestic Rating (Demand Notices) (England) (Amendment) Regulations 2019
102	The EU Export Credits Legislation (Revocation) (EU Exit) Regulations 2019
103	
104	The Taxation (Cross-border Trade) Act 2018 (Appointed day No. 3) and the Value Added Tax (Postal Packets and Amendment) (EU Exit) Regulations 2018 (Appointed day) (EU Exit) Regulations 2019
105	The Taxation (Cross-border Trade) Act 2018 (Value Added Tax Transitional Provisions) (EU Exit) Regulations 2019
106	The Electricity (Individual Exemptions from the Requirement for a Transmission Licence) (England and Wales) Order 2019
107	The Greenhouse Gas Emissions Trading Scheme (Amendment) (EU Exit) Regulations 2019
108	The Customs (Export) (EU Exit) Regulations 2019
109	The Organic Products (Amendment) (EU Exit) Regulations 2019
110	The Abolition of the Right to Buy and Associated Rights (Wales) Act 2018 (Consequential Amendments and Savings Provisions) Regulations 2019 (Note: This Order was also implemented in Welsh as Rheoliadau Deddf Diddymu’r Hawl i Brynu a Hawliau Cysylltiedig (Cymru) 2018 (Diwygiadau Canlyniadol a Darpariaethau Arbed) 2019)
111	The Exotic Disease (Amendment) (Northern Ireland) (EU Exit) Regulations 2019
112	The Water (Amendment) (Northern Ireland) (EU Exit) Regulations 2019
113	The Customs (Records) (EU Exit) Regulations 2019
114	The Radioactive Contaminated Land (Modification of Enactments) (Wales) (Amendment) (EU Exit) Regulations 2019 (Note: This Order was also implemented in Welsh as Rheoliadau Tir a Halogwyd yn Ymbelydrol (Addasu Deddfiadau) (Cymru) (Diwygio) (Ymadael â’r UE) 2019)
115	The Elections (Wales) (Amendment) (EU Exit) Regulations 2019 (Note: This Order was also implemented in Welsh as Rheoliadau Etholiadau (Cymru) (Diwygio) (Ymadael â’r UE) 2019)
116	The Service Charges (Consultation Requirements) (Wales) (Amendment) (EU Exit) Regulations 2019 (Note: This Order was also implemented in Welsh as Rheoliadau Taliadau Gwasanaeth (Gofynion Ymgynghori) (Cymru) (Diwygio) (Ymadael â’r UE) 2019)
117	The Animal Breeding (Amendment) (EU Exit) Regulations 2019
118	The Pesticides (Amendment) (Northern Ireland) (EU Exit) Regulations 2019
119	The Air Navigation (Restriction of Flying) (Brixham, Devon) (Emergency) Regulations 2019
120	The Equality Act 2010 (Statutory Duties) (Wales) (Amendment) (EU Exit) Regulations 2019 (Note: This Order was also implemented in Welsh as Rheoliadau Deddf Cydraddoldeb 2010 (Dyletswyddau Statudol) (Cymru) (Diwygio) (Ymadael â’r UE) 2019)
121	The Customs Safety and Security (Penalty) Regulations 2019
122	The A483 Trunk Road (Powys/Carmarthenshire County Boundary to Llandrindod Wells, Powys) (Temporary Speed Restrictions & No Overtaking) Order 2019 (Note: This Order was also implemented in Welsh as Gorchymyn Cefnffordd yr A483 (Ffin Powys/Sir Gaerfyrddin i Landrindod, Powys) (Cyfyngiadau Cyflymder Dros Dro a Dim Goddiweddyd) 2019)
123	The Environmental Impact Assessment (Amendment) (Northern Ireland) (EU Exit) Regulations 2019
124	The Dover (Electoral Changes) Order 2019
125	The Reigate and Banstead (Electoral Changes) Order 2019
126	The Runnymede (Electoral Changes) Order 2019
127	The Wireless telegraphy (License Charges for the 900 MHz Frequency Band and the 1800 MHz Frequency Band) (Amendment) Regulations 2019
128	The Social Security (Amendment) (EU Exit) Regulations 2019
129	The Social Security (Amendment) (Northern Ireland) (EU Exit) Regulations 2019
130	The Civil Legal Aid (Procedure) (Amendment) Regulations 2019
131	The Marketing of Seeds and Plant Propagating Material (Amendment) (England and Wales) (EU Exit) Regulations 2019
132	The Plant Health (Wales) (Amendment) Order 2019 (Note: This Order was also implemented in Welsh as Gorchymyn Iechyd Planhigion (Cymru) (Diwygio) 2019)
133	The Leicestershire County Council (Zouch Bridge Replacement) Bridge Scheme 2017 Confirmation Instrument 2019
134	The Iran (Sanctions) (Human Rights) (EU Exit) Regulations 2019
135	The Venezuela (Sanctions) (EU Exit) Regulations 2019
136	The Burma (Sanctions) (EU Exit) Regulations 2019
137	The Export Control (Amendment) (EU Exit) Regulations 2019
138	The Further Education Bodies (Insolvency) Regulations 2019
139	The Education (Student Fees, Awards and Support) (Amendment) (EU Exit) Regulations 2019
140	The Customs (Consequential Amendments) (EU Exit) Regulations 2019
141	The Rights of Passengers in Bus and Coach Transport (Amendment etc.) (EU Exit) Regulations 2019
142	The Education (Student Fees, Awards and Support etc.) (Amendment) Regulations 2019
143	The Criminal Procedure (Amendment) Rules 2019
144	
145	The Accounts and Reports (Amendment) (EU Exit) Regulations 2019
146	The Insolvency (Amendment) (EU Exit) Regulations 2019
147	The Civil Procedure (Amendment) (EU Exit) Rules 2019
148	The Customs (Contravention of a Relevant Rule) (Amendment) (EU Exit) Regulations 2019
149	The National Health Service (Paramedic Independent Prescriber and Paramedic Supplementary Prescriber) (Wales) (Miscellaneous Amendments) Regulations 2019 (Note: This Order was also implemented in Welsh as Rheoliadau’r Gwasanaeth Iechyd Gwladol (Parafeddyg-Ragnodydd Annibynnol a Pharafeddyg-Ragnodydd Atodol) (Cymru) (Diwygiadau Amrywiol) 2019)
150	The Food (Amendment) (England) (EU Exit) Regulations 2019
151	The Communications (Television Licensing) (Amendment) Regulations 2019
152	The A487 Trunk Road (Aberystwyth, Ceredigion to the Powys/Gwynedd County Boundary at Dyfi Bridge, Powys) (Temporary Speed Restrictions and No Overtaking) Order 2019 (Note: This Order was also implemented in Welsh as Gorchymyn Cefnffordd yr A487 (Aberystwyth, Ceredigion i Ffin Sirol Powys/Gwynedd wrth Bontarddyfi, Powys) (Cyfyngiadau Cyflymder Dros Dro a Dim Goddiweddyd) 2019)
153	The A487 Trunk Road (Pembrokeshire/Ceredigion County Boundary, Near Cardigan to Aberystwyth, Ceredigion) (Temporary Speed Restrictions and No Overtaking) Order 2019 (Note: This Order was also implemented in Welsh as Gorchymyn Cefnffordd yr A487 (Ffin Sirol Sir Benfro/Sir Ceredigion, Man Ger Aberteifi i Aberystwyth, Ceredigion) (Cyfyngiadau Cyflymder Dros Dro a Dim Goddiweddyd) 2019)
154	The A465 Trunk Road (Hardwick Interchange, Abergavenny, Monmouthshire) (Temporary Prohibition of Vehicles, Cyclists & Pedestrians) Order 2019 (Note: This Order was also implemented in Welsh as Gorchymyn Cefnffordd yr A465 (Cyfnewidfa Hardwick, Y Fenni, Sir Fynwy) (Gwahardd Cerbydau, Beicwyr a Cherddwyr Dros Dro) 2019)
155	The A40 Trunk Road (Glangrwyney to Pont Wen, Halfway, Powys) (Temporary Speed Restrictions and No Overtaking) Order 2019 (Note: This Order was also implemented in Welsh as Gorchymyn Cefnffordd yr A40 (Glangrwyne i Bont Wen, Halfway, Powys) (Cyfyngiadau Cyflymder Dros Dro a Dim Goddiweddyd) 2019)
156	The Transfrontier Shipment of Radioactive Waste and Spent Fuel (EU Exit) Regulations 2019
157	The Livestock (Records, Identification and Movement) (Amendment) (Northern Ireland) (EU Exit) Regulations 2019
158	The Animal Health and Welfare (Amendment) (Northern Ireland) (EU Exit) Regulations 2019
159	The Pension Protection Fund and Occupational Pension Schemes (Levy Ceiling and Compensation Cap) Order 2019
160	The Merchant Shipping (Technical Requirements for Inland Waterway Vessels) (Amendment) Regulations 2019
161	The A55 Trunk Road (Eastbound Carriageway between Junction 33 (Northop) & Junction 33b (Ewloe), Flintshire) (Temporary Prohibition of Vehicles, Cyclists & Pedestrians) Order 2019 (Note: This Order was also implemented in Welsh as Gorchymyn Cefnffordd yr A55 (Cerbytffordd tua’r Dwyrain rhwng Cyffordd 33 (Llaneurgain) a Chyffordd 33b (Ewloe), Sir y Fflint) (Gwahardd Cerbydau, Beicwyr a Cherddwyr Dros Dro) 2019)
162	The Marketing of Seeds and Plant Propagating Material (Amendment etc.) (EU Exit) Regulations 2019
163	The Adult Placement Services (Service Providers and Responsible Individuals) (Wales) Regulations 2019 (Note: This Order was also implemented in Welsh as Rheoliadau Gwasanaethau Lleoli Oedolion (Darparwyr Gwasanaethau ac Unigolion Cyfrifol) (Cymru) 2019)
164	The Air Navigation (Restriction of Flying) (Brixham, Devon) (Emergency) (Revocation) Regulations 2019
165	The Regulated Advocacy Services (Service Providers and Responsible Individuals) (Wales) Regulations 2019 (Note: This Order was also implemented in Welsh as Rheoliadau Gwasanaethau Eirioli Rheoleiddiedig (Darparwyr Gwasanaethau ac Unigolion Cyfrifol) (Cymru) 2019)
166	The Legal Services Act 2007 (Designation as a Licensing Authority) Order 2019
167	The Welfare Reform Act 2012 (Commencement No. 32 and Savings and Transitional Provisions) Order 2019
168	
169	
170	
171	
172	
173	
174	
175	
176	
177	
178	The A40 Trunk Road (Gibraltar Tunnels, Monmouth, Monmouthshire) (Temporary Traffic Prohibitions & Restrictions) Order 2019 (Note: This Order was also implemented in Welsh as Gorchymyn Cefnffordd yr A40 (Twneli Gibraltar, Trefynwy, Sir Fynwy) (Gwaharddiadau a Chyfyngiadau Traffig Dros Dro) 2019)
179	The Nutrition (Miscellaneous Amendments) (Wales) (EU Exit) Regulations 2019 (Note: This Order was also implemented in Welsh as Rheoliadau Maethiad (Diwygiadau Amrywiol) (Cymru) (Ymadael â’r UE) 2019)
180	The Plant Health etc. (Fees) (England) (Amendment) Regulations 2019
181	The A55 Trunk Road (Eastbound Carriageway between Junction 31 (Caerwys) & Junction 32a (Billy Jeans), Flintshire) (Temporary Prohibition of Vehicles, Cyclists & Pedestrians) Order 2019 (Note: This Order was also implemented in Welsh as Gorchymyn Cefnffordd yr A55 (Y Gerbytffordd tua’r Dwyrain rhwng Cyffordd 31 (Caerwys) a Chyffordd 32a (Billy Jeans), Sir y Fflint) (Gwahardd Cerbydau, Beicwyr a Cherddwyr Dros Dro) 2019)
182	The Consular Fees (Amendment) Order 2019
183	The Scotland Act 1998 (Specification of Functions and Transfer of Property etc.) Order 2019
184	The Eritrea (Sanctions) (Overseas Territories) (Revocation) Order 2019
185	The Sanctions (Overseas Territories) (Amendment) Order 2019
186	The Naval, Military and Air Forces Etc. (Disablement and Death) Service Pensions (Amendment) Order 2019
187	The Free School Lunches and Milk (Universal Credit) (Wales) Order 2019 (Note: This Order was also implemented in Welsh as Gorchymyn Ciniawau Ysgol a Llaeth am Ddim (Credyd Cynhwysol) (Cymru) 2019)
188	The Waste (Miscellaneous Amendments) (EU Exit) (No. 2) Regulations 2019
189	The Education (Student Loans) (Repayment) (Amendment) Regulations 2019
190	The Genetically Modified Organisms (Amendment) (Northern Ireland) (EU Exit) Regulations 2019
191	
192	The Occupational and Personal Pension Schemes (Amendment etc.) (EU Exit) Regulations 2019
193	The Occupational and Personal Pension Schemes (Amendment etc.) (Northern Ireland) (EU Exit) Regulations 2019
194	The Driving Licences (Amendment) (Northern Ireland) (EU Exit) Regulations 2019
195	The Nuclear Safeguards (Fissionable Material and Relevant International Agreements) (EU Exit) Regulations 2019
196	The Nuclear Safeguards (EU Exit) Regulations 2019
197	
198	The Crawley (Electoral Changes) Order 2019
199	The Norwich (Electoral Changes) Order 2019
200	

== 201–999 ==
Number	Title
274	The Agency Workers (Amendment) Regulations 2019
834	The Law Applicable to Contractual Obligations and Non-Contractual Obligations (Amendment etc.) (EU Exit) Regulations 2019

== 1201–1300 ==
Number	Title
1201	The Designation of Schools Having a Religious Character (Independent Schools) (England) Order 2019
1202	The Designation of Schools Having a Religious Character (England) (No. 2) Order 2019
1203	
1204	The Access to the Countryside (Coastal Margin) (Newport Bridge to North Gare) Order 2019
1205	The Air Navigation (Restriction of Flying) (Glasgow) Regulations 2019
1206	The International Bank for Reconstruction and Development (General Capital Increase) Order 2019
1207	The International Bank for Reconstruction and Development (Selective Capital Increase) Order 2019
1208	The Air navigation (Restriction of Flying) (Thames Estuary) (Emergency) Regulations 2019
1209	
1210	The Heavy Commercial Vehicles in Kent (No. 3) Order 2019
1211	The Weights and Measures Act 1985 (Amendment) and Units of Measurement Regulations 1986 (Amendment) Regulations 2019
1212	The Financial Services (Electronic Money, Payment Services and Miscellaneous Amendments) (EU Exit) Regulations 2019
1213	The Invasive Alien Species (Enforcement and Permitting) (Amendment) Order 2019
1214	The Value Added Tax (Miscellaneous Amendments and Transitional Provisions) (EU Exit) Regulations 2019
1215	The Customs and Excise (Miscellaneous Provisions and Amendments) (EU Exit) Regulations 2019
1216	The Excise Duties (Miscellaneous Amendments) (EU Exit) (No. 4) Regulations 2019
1217	
1218	The Food Information (Amendment) (England) Regulations 2019
1219	The Customs Safety and Security Procedures (EU Exit) (No. 2) Regulations 2019
1220	The Animal Health, Invasive Alien Species, Plant Breeders’ Rights and Seeds (Amendment etc.) (EU Exit) Regulations 2019
1221	The Data-gathering Powers (Relevant Data) (Amendment) (EU Exit) Regulations 2019
1222	
1223	The Southern Inshore Fisheries and Conservation (Amendment) Order 2019
1224	The Air Services (Competition) (Amendment and Revocation) (EU Exit) Regulations 2019
1225	The Trade in Animals and Animal Products (Legislative Functions) and Veterinary Surgeons (Amendment) (EU Exit) Regulations 2019
1226	The A4042 Trunk Road (Caerleon Roundabout, Newport to Cwmbran Roundabout, Torfaen) (Temporary Prohibition of Vehicles) Order 2019 (Note: This Order was also implemented in Welsh as Gorchymyn Cefnffordd yr A4042 (Cylchfan Caerllion, Casnewydd i Gylchfan Cwmbrân, Torfaen) (Gwahardd Cerbydau Dros Dro) 2019)
1227	The Tonnage Tax (Training Requirement) (Amendment etc.) Regulations 2019
1228	The Town and Country Planning (North Weald Airfield) (EU Exit) Special Development Order 2019
1229	The Animal Health and Genetically Modified Organisms (Amendment) (EU Exit) Regulations 2019
1230	The Town and Country Planning (Waterbrook Ashford) (EU Exit) Special Development Order 2019
1231	The Town and Country Planning (Car Park D Ebbsfleet International Station) (EU Exit) Special Development Order 2019
1232	The Capital Requirements (Amendment) (EU Exit) Regulations 2019
1233	The Risk Transformation and Solvency 2 (Amendment) (EU Exit) Regulations 2019
1234	The Prospectus (Amendment etc.) (EU Exit) Regulations 2019
1235	The Air Navigation (Restriction of Flying) (Thames Estuary) (Emergency) (Revocation) Regulations 2019
1236	The Export Control (Sanctions) (Amendment) Order 2019
1237	The Taxation of Chargeable Gains Act 1992, Schedule 8B (Substitution of Dates) Regulations 2019
1238	The Finance Act 2009, Sections 101 and 102 (Penalties for Offshore Evasion or Non-Compliance) (Appointed Day) Order 2019
1239	The North Western Inshore Fisheries and Conservation (Amendment) Order 2019
1240	The Value Added Tax (Section 55A) (Specified Services and Excepted Supplies) (Change of Commencement Day) Order 2019
1241	The Social Security (Industrial Injuries) (Prescribed Diseases) Amendment Regulations 2019
1242	The British Nationality (General) (Amendment) Regulations 2019
1243	The Income-related Benefits (Subsidy to Authorities) Amendment Order 2019
1244	The M4 Motorway (Junction 41 (Pentyla) to Junction 42 (Earlswood), Neath Port Talbot) (Temporary 50 mph Speed Limit) Order 2018 (Revocation) Order 2019 (Note: This Order was also implemented in Welsh as Gorchymyn Gorchymyn Traffordd yr M4 (Cyffordd 41 (Pentyla) i Gyffordd 42 (Earlswood), Castell-nedd Port Talbot) (Terfyn Cyflymder 50 mya Dros Dro) 2018 (Dirymu) 2019)
1245	The Competition (Amendment etc.) (EU Exit) (No. 2) Regulations 2019
1246	The Product Safety, Metrology and Mutual Recognition Agreement (Amendment) (EU Exit) Regulations 2019
1247	The Specific Food Hygiene (Regulation (EC) No. 853/2004) (Amendment) (EU Exit) Regulations 2019
1248	The A55 Trunk Road (Junction 36 (Warren Interchange) to the Wales/England Border, Flintshire) (Temporary Prohibition of Vehicles, Cyclists and Pedestrians) Order 2019 (Note: This Order was also implemented in Welsh as Gorchymyn Cefnffordd yr A55 (Cyffordd 36 (Cyfnewidfa Warren) i Ffin Cymru/Lloegr, Sir y Fflint) (Gwahardd Cerbydau, Beicwyr a Cherddwyr Dros Dro) 2019)
1249	The Universal Credit (Childcare Costs and Minimum Income Floor) (Amendment) Regulations 2019
1250	The Taxation of Hybrid Capital Instruments (Amendment of Section 475C of the Corporation Tax Act 2009) Regulations 2019
1251	The Hybrid and Other Mismatches (Financial Instrument: Exclusions) Regulations 2019
1252	The Genetically Modified Organisms (Deliberate Release) (Amendment) (England) Regulations 2019
1253	The Ecodesign for Energy-Related Products and Energy Information (Amendment) Regulations 2019
1254	The Midland Metro (Penalty Fares) Order 2019
1255	
1256	The Financial Services and Markets Act 2000 (Benchmarks) (Amendment) Regulations 2019
1257	The Plant Health etc. (Miscellaneous Fees) (England) (Amendment) Regulations 2019
1258	
1259	The Isles of Scilly (Application of Water Legislation) Order 2019
1260	The Houses in Multiple Occupation (Specified Educational Establishments) (England) (Amendment) Regulations 2019
1261	
1262	The Organ Donation (Deemed Consent) Act 2019 (Commencement No. 1) Regulations 2019
1263	
1264	The Appeals to Traffic Commissioners (Procedure) (England) Regulations 2019
1265	The Public Service Vehicles (Registration of Local Services in Enhanced Partnership Areas) (England) Regulations 2019
1266	The A55 Trunk Road (Junction 5 (Treban Interchange) to Junction 6 (Nant Turnpike Interchange), Isle of Anglesey) (Temporary Prohibition of Vehicles, Cyclists & Pedestrians) (No.2) Order 2019 (Note: This Order was also implemented in Welsh as Gorchymyn Cefnffordd yr A55 (Cyffordd 5 (Cyfnewidfa Treban) i Gyffordd 6 (Cyfnewidfa Tyrpeg Nant), Ynys Môn) (Gwahardd Cerbydau, Beicwyr a Cherddwyr Dros Dro) (Rhif 2) 2019)
1267	The School Teachers’ Pay and Conditions (England) Order 2019
1268	The Abergelli Power Gas Fired Generating Station Order 2019
1269	The Local Authorities (Change to the Years of Ordinary Elections) (Wales) Order 2019 (Note: This Order was also implemented in Welsh as Gorchymyn Awdurdodau Lleol (Newid Blynyddoedd Etholiadau Cyffredin) (Cymru) 2019)
1270	The International Driving Permits (Fees) (EU Exit) (Revocation) Regulations 2019
1271	The M20 Junction 10a Development Consent (Amendment) Order 2019
1272	The Fisheries, Aquaculture and Marine (Functions Exercisable in or as Regards Scotland) (Amendment) (EU Exit) (No. 2) Regulations 2019
1273	The Air Navigation (Restriction of Flying) (Thames Estuary) (No. 2) (Emergency) Regulations 2019
1274	The Police Act 1997 (Criminal Records and Registration) (Jersey) (Amendment) Regulations 2019
1275	The Police Act 1997 (Criminal Records and Registration) (Guernsey) (Amendment) Regulations 2019
1276	The Police Act 1997 (Criminal Records and Registration) (Isle of Man) (Amendment) Regulations 2019
1277	The A458 Trunk Road (Broad Street and High Street, Welshpool, Powys) (Temporary Prohibition of Vehicles) Order 2019 (Note: This Order was also implemented in Welsh as Gorchymyn Cefnffordd yr A458 (Broad Street a High Street, Y Trallwng, Powys) (Gwahardd Cerbydau Dros Dro) 2019)
1278	The Agriculture (Calculation of Value for Compensation) (Revocations) (Wales) Regulations 2019 (Note: This Order was also implemented in Welsh as Rheoliadau Amaethyddiaeth (Cyfrifo Gwerth Digollediad) (Dirymiadau) (Cymru) 2019)
1279	The Agriculture (Model Clauses for Fixed Equipment) (Wales) Regulations 2019 (Note: This Order was also implemented in Welsh as Rheoliadau Amaethyddiaeth (Cymalau Enghreifftiol ar gyfer Cyfarpar Sefydlog) (Cymru) 2019)
1280	The Plant Health (Wales) (Amendment) (No. 3) Order 2019 (Note: This Order was also implemented in Welsh as Gorchymyn Iechyd Planhigion (Cymru) (Diwygio) (Rhif. 3) 2019)
1281	The Retained EU Law (Miscellaneous Amendments) (Wales) (EU Exit) Regulations 2019 (Note: This Order was also implemented in Welsh as Rheoliadau Cyfraith yr UE a Ddargedwir (Diwygiadau Amrywiol) (Cymru) (Ymadael â’r UE) 2019)
1282	The Customs (Import Duty) (EU Exit) Regulations 2018 and the Customs (Export) (EU Exit) Regulations 2019 (Appointed Day) (EU Exit) Regulations 2019
1283	The Air Navigation (Restriction of Flying) (Thames Estuary) (No. 2) (Emergency) (Revocation) Regulations 2019
1284	The Sea Fishing (Miscellaneous Amendments) Regulations 2019
1285	The Environmental Damage (Prevention and Remediation) (England) (Amendment) Regulations 2019
1286	The Air Navigation (Minimum Age for Operators of Small Unmanned Aircraft) Regulations 2019
1287	
1288	The Humane Trapping Standards (England and Wales) Regulations 2019
1289	The Spirit Drinks and Scotch Whisky (Amendment) Regulations 2019
1290	The Pesticides (Amendment) Regulations 2019
1291	
1292	
1293	The Healthcare (European Economic Area and Switzerland Arrangements) (EU Exit) Regulations 2019
1294	
1295	
1296	
1297	
1298	
1299	
1300	

== 1301–1400 ==
Number	Title
1301	The A55 Trunk Road (Slip Roads at Junction 2 (Holyhead Interchange) & Junction 5 (Treban Interchange), Anglesey) (Temporary Prohibition of Vehicles) Order 2019 (Note: This Order was also implemented in Welsh as Gorchymyn Cefnffordd yr A55 (Ffyrdd Ymuno ac Ymadael wrth Gyffordd 2 (Cyfnewidfa Caergybi) a Chyffordd 5 (Cyfnewidfa Treban), Ynys Môn) (Gwahardd Cerbydau Dros Dro) 2019)
1302	The Social Security (Iceland) (Liechtenstein) (Norway) (Citizens’ Rights Agreement) Order 2019
1303	The Social Security (Switzerland) (Citizens’ Rights Agreement) Order 2019
1304	The Merchant Shipping (Marine Equipment) (Amendment) (UK and US Mutual Recognition Agreement) (EU Exit) Regulations 2019
1305	The Pilotage Act 1987 (Amendment) Regulations 2019
1306	The M4 Motorway (Rogiet Toll Plaza, Monmouthshire) (50 mph Speed Limit) Regulations 2010 (Revocation) Regulations 2019 (Note: This Order was also implemented in Welsh as Rheoliadau Rheoliadau Traffordd yr M4 (Man Casglu Tollau Rogiet, Sir Fynwy) (Terfyn Cyflymder 50 mya) 2010 (Dirymu) 2019)
1307	The Cross-border Trade (Public Notices) (EU Exit) Regulations 2019
1308	The Welfare of Animals at the Time of Killing (England and Northern Ireland) (Amendment) (EU Exit) Regulations 2019
1309	
1310	The Railways (Safety, Access, Management and Interoperability) (Miscellaneous Amendments and Transitional Provision) (EU Exit) Regulations 2019
1311	
1312	The Common Fisheries Policy and Animals (Amendment etc.) (EU Exit) Regulations 2019
1313	The Agriculture, Environment and Rural Affairs (Amendment) (Northern Ireland) (EU Exit) (No. 2) Regulations 2019
1314	The Social Security (Capital Disregards) (Amendment) Regulations 2019
1315	The Drax Power (Generating Stations) Order 2019
1316	The Genetically Modified Organisms (Deliberate Release) (Amendment) (Wales) Regulations 2019 (Note: This Order was also implemented in Welsh as Rheoliadau Organeddau a Addaswyd yn Enetig (Eu Gollwng yn Fwriadol) (Diwygio) (Cymru) 2019)
1317	The Local Loans (Increase of Limit) Order 2019
1318	The Crime (Overseas Production Orders) Act 2019 (Commencement No. 1) Regulations 2019
1319	The Trade Remedies (Increase in Imports Causing Serious Injury to UK Producers) (Amendment) (EU Exit) Regulations 2019
1320	The Air Navigation (Restriction of Flying) (Birkhall) (Restricted Zone EG R705) Regulations 2019
1321	The Air Navigation (Restriction of Flying) (Balmoral) (Restricted Zone EG R704) Regulations 2019
1322	The A6055 (A1(M) Junction 52, Catterick Interchange) (Trunking) Order 2019
1323	The Misuse of Drugs Act 1971 (Amendment) Order 2019
1324	The Inspectors of Education, Children's Services and Skills (No. 3) Order 2019
1325	
1326	The Fire and Rescue Services (Appointment of Inspector) (Wales) (Revocation) Order 2019
1327	The Patents (Isle of Man) (Amendment) (EU Exit) Order 2019
1328	The Air Navigation (Restriction of Flying) (State Opening of Parliament) Regulations 2019
1329	The Air Navigation (Restriction of Flying) (Port of Dover) Regulations 2019
1330	The National Health Service (Amendments Relating to Serious Shortage Protocols) (Wales) Regulations 2019 (Note: This Order was also implemented in Welsh as Rheoliadau’r Gwasanaeth Iechyd Gwladol (Diwygiadau sy’n Ymwneud â Phrotocolau Prinder Difrifol) (Cymru) 2019)
1331	
1332	The Sea Fishing (Miscellaneous Amendments) (Wales) Regulations 2019 (Note: This Order was also implemented in Welsh as Rheoliadau Pysgota Môr (Diwygiadau Amrywiol) (Cymru) 2019)
1333	The Legislation (Wales) Act 2019 (Commencement) Order 2019 (Note: This Order was also implemented in Welsh as Gorchymyn Deddf Deddfwriaeth (Cymru) 2019 (Cychwyn) 2019)
1334	The Rural Affairs (Miscellaneous Amendments) (Wales) (EU Exit) (No. 2) Regulations 2019 (Note: This Order was also implemented in Welsh as Rheoliadau Materion Gwledig (Diwygiadau Amrywiol) (Cymru) (Ymadael â’r UE) (Rhif 2) 2019)
1335	The Registered Designs and Trade Marks (Isle of Man) (Amendment) (EU Exit) Order 2019
1336	The Public Health (Minimum Price for Alcohol) (Wales) Act 2018 (Commencement No. 1) Order 2019 (Note: This Order was also implemented in Welsh as Gorchymyn Deddf Iechyd y Cyhoedd (Isafbris am Alcohol) (Cymru) 2018 (Cychwyn Rhif 1) 2019)
1337	The Companies House Trading Fund (Revocation) Order 2019
1338	The Civil Jurisdiction and Judgments (Civil and Family) (Amendment) (EU Exit) Regulations 2019
1339	The Rights, Equality and Citizenship Programme (Revocation) (EU Exit) Regulations 2019
1340	The Persistent Organic Pollutants (Amendment) (EU Exit) Regulations 2019
1341	The Public Interest Disclosure (Prescribed Persons) (Amendment) Order 2019
1342	The Agricultural Products, Food and Drink (Amendment etc.) (EU Exit) Regulations 2019
1343	The Common Organisation of the Markets in Agricultural Products (Producer Organisations and Wine) (Amendment etc.) (EU Exit) Regulations 2019
1344	The Common Agricultural Policy (Market Measures, Notifications and Direct Payments) (Miscellaneous Amendments) (EU Exit) Regulations 2019
1345	The Hybrid and Other Mismatches (Financial Instruments: Excluded Instruments) Regulations 2019
1346	The Taxation (Cross-border Trade) (Miscellaneous Provisions) (EU Exit) (No. 2) Regulations 2019
1347	The Cableway Installations (Amendment) (EU Exit) Regulations 2019
1348	The Finance Act 2019, Schedule 18 (VAT Groups: Eligibility) (Appointed Day) Regulations 2019
1349	The Northern Ireland (Ministerial Appointment Functions) (No. 2) Regulations 2019
1350	The Environment (Legislative Functions from Directives) (EU Exit) Regulations 2019
1351	The Local Government Pension Scheme (West Midlands Integrated Transport Authority Pension Fund and West Midlands Pension Fund Merger) Regulations 2019
1352	The INSPIRE (Amendment) (EU Exit) Regulations 2019
1353	The Nicaragua (Asset-Freezing) Regulations 2019
1354	The Control of Trade in Endangered Species (Miscellaneous Amendments) Regulations 2019
1355	The Air Navigation (Restriction of Flying) (Edinburgh) Regulations 2019
1356	The M4 Motorway (Junction 35 (Pencoed), Bridgend County Borough) (Temporary 40 mph Speed Limit) Order 2019
1357	The Jobseeker's Allowance and Universal Credit (Higher-Level Sanctions) (Amendment) Regulations 2019
1358	
1359	The Housing and Planning Act 2016 (Commencement No. 11) Regulations 2019
1360	The A4042 Trunk Road (Cwmbran Roundabout to Pontypool Roundabout, Torfaen) (Temporary Traffic Prohibitions and 40 mph Speed Limit) Order 2019 (Note: This Order was also implemented in Welsh as Gorchymyn Cefnffordd yr A4042 (Cylchfan Cwmbrân i Gylchfan Pont-y-pŵl, Torfaen) (Gwaharddiadau Traffig a Therfyn Cyflymder 40 mya Dros Dro) 2019)
1361	The Electronic Commerce and Solvency 2 (Amendment etc.) (EU Exit) Regulations 2019
1362	The Misuse of Drugs and Misuse of Drugs (Designation) (Amendment) (England, Wales and Scotland) Regulations 2019
1363	The School Teachers’ Pay and Conditions (Wales) Order 2019 (Note: This Order was also implemented in Welsh as Gorchymyn Cyflog ac Amodau Athrawon Ysgol (Cymru) 2019)
1364	The Northern Ireland (Extension of Period for Executive Formation) (No. 2) Regulations 2019
1365	The A40 Trunk Road (Llandovery Level Crossing, Llandovery, Carmarthenshire) (Temporary Prohibition of Vehicles) Order 2019 (Note: This Order was also implemented in Welsh as Gorchymyn Cefnffordd yr A40 (Croesfan Reilffordd Llanymddyfri, Llanymddyfri, Sir Gaerfyrddin) (Gwahardd Cerbydau Dros Dro) 2019)
1366	The Agricultural Products, Food and Drink (Amendment) (EU Exit) Regulations 2019
1367	The Magistrates’ Courts (Amendment) Rules 2019
1368	The Magistrates’ Courts (Proceeds of Crime Act 2002 (External Requests and Orders) Order 2005, Part 5A, and Miscellaneous Amendments) Rules 2019
1369	The Magistrates’ Courts (Proceeds of Crime Act 2002 (External Requests and Orders) Order 2005, Part 5B) Rules 2019
1370	The Cross-Border Distribution of Funds, Proxy Advisors, Prospectus and Gibraltar (Amendment) (EU Exit) Regulations 2019
1371	
1372	
1373	The Mental Health Units (Use of Force) Act 2018 Commencement (No. 1) Regulations 2019
1374	The A470 & A479 Trunk Roads (Llyswen, Powys) (Temporary Prohibition of Vehicles) Order 2019 (Note: This Order was also implemented in Welsh as Gorchymyn Cefnffyrdd yr A470 a’r A479 (Llys-wen, Powys) (Gwahardd Cerbydau Dros Dro) 2019)
1375	The Animal Health and Welfare (Miscellaneous Amendments) (Wales) (EU Exit) (Amendment) Regulations 2019 (Note: This Order was also implemented in Welsh as Rheoliadau Iechyd a Lles Anifeiliaid (Diwygiadau Amrywiol) (Cymru) (Ymadael â’r UE) (Diwygio) 2019)
1376	The Rural Affairs (Miscellaneous Amendments) (Wales) (EU Exit) (No. 3) Regulations 2019 (Note: This Order was also implemented in Welsh as Rheoliadau Materion Gwledig (Diwygiadau Amrywiol) (Cymru) (Ymadael â’r UE) (Rhif 3) 2019)
1377	The A483 Trunk Road (Ffairfach Level Crossing, Ffairfach, Carmarthenshire) (Temporary Prohibition of Vehicles) Order 2019 (Note: This Order was also implemented in Welsh as (Croesfan Reilffordd Ffair-fach, Ffair-fach, Sir Gaerfyrddin) (Gwahardd Cerbydau Dros Dro) 2019)
1378	The Plant Health etc. (Miscellaneous Fees) (Wales) (Amendment) Regulations 2019 (Note: This Order was also implemented in Welsh as Rheoliadau Iechyd Planhigion etc. (Ffioedd Amrywiol) (Cymru) (Diwygio) 2019)
1379	The Passenger and Goods Vehicles (Tachographs) (Amendment etc.) Regulations 2019
1380	The Cross-border Trade (Public Notices) (EU Exit) (Revocation) Regulations 2019
1381	
1382	The Seeds (Amendment etc.) (Wales) (EU Exit) Regulations 2019 (Note: This Order was also implemented in Welsh as Rheoliadau Hadau (Diwygio etc.) (Cymru) (Ymadael â’r UE) 2019)
1383	The Immigration (Amendment) (EU Exit) Regulations 2019
1384	The Accreditation of Forensic Service Providers (Amendment) Regulations 2019
1385	The Human Medicines and Medical Devices (Amendment etc.) (EU Exit) Regulations 2019
1386	The Air Navigation (Restriction of Flying) (West Thurrock) (Emergency) Regulations 2019
1387	The Small-scale Radio Multiplex and Community Digital Radio Order 2019
1388	The Heavy Commercial Vehicles in Kent (No. 1) Order 2019
1389	The European Parliamentary Elections Etc. (Repeal, Revocation, Amendment and Saving Provisions) (United Kingdom and Gibraltar) (EU Exit) (Amendment) Regulations 2019
1390	The Financial Services (Miscellaneous) (Amendment) (EU Exit) (No. 3) Regulations 2019
1391	The Air Navigation (Restriction of Flying) (West Thurrock) (Emergency) (Revocation) Regulations 2019
1392	The Statutory Auditors, Third Country Auditors and International Accounting Standards (Amendment) (EU Exit) Regulations 2019
1393	The Gas Tariffs Code (Amendment) (EU Exit) Regulations 2019
1394	The Heavy Commercial Vehicles in Kent (No. 2) Order 2019
1395	
1396	The Legal Aid, Sentencing and Punishment of Offenders Act 2012 (Legal Aid for Separated Children) (Miscellaneous Amendments) Order 2019
1397	The Criminal Justice Act 1988 (Reviews of Sentencing) (Amendment) Order 2019
1398	The Air Navigation (Restriction of Flying) (Carlisle) (Emergency) Regulations 2019
1399	The Non-Domestic Rating Contributions (Wales) (Amendment) Regulations 2019 (Note: This Order was also implemented in Welsh as Rheoliadau Cyfraniadau Ardrethu Annomestig (Cymru) (Diwygio) 2019)
1400	The Air Navigation (Restriction of Flying) (Tilbury Docks) (Emergency) Regulations 2019

== 1401–1500 ==
Number	Title
1401	The Freedom of establishment and Free movement of services (EU Exit) Regulations 2019
1402	The Agriculture (Miscellaneous Amendments) (EU Exit) Regulations 2019
1403	The Common Organisation of the Markets in Agricultural Products (Transitional Arrangements etc.) (Amendment) (EU Exit) Regulations 2019
1404	The Agricultural Holdings Act 1986 (Variation of Schedule 8) (Wales) Order 2019 (Note: This Order was also implemented in Welsh as Gorchymyn Deddf Daliadau Amaethyddol 1986 (Amrywio Atodlen 8) (Cymru) 2019)
1405	The Common Agricultural policy and Common Organisation of the Markets in Agricultural Products (Miscellaneous Amendments) (EU Exit) Regulations 2019
1406	The Air navigation (Restriction of Flying) (Tilbury Docks) (Emergency) (Revocation) Regulations 2019
1407	The Genetically modified organism|Genetically Modified Organisms (Deliberate Release) (Amendment) (Wales) (Amendment) Regulations 2019 (Note: This Order was also implemented in Welsh as Rheoliadau Organeddau a Addaswyd yn Enetig (Eu Gollwng yn Fwriadol) (Diwygio) (Cymru) (Diwygio) 2019)
1408	The Rural Affairs and Environment (Miscellaneous Amendments) (Wales) Regulations 2019 (Note: This Order was also implemented in Welsh as Rheoliadau Materion Gwledig a’r Amgylchedd (Diwygiadau Amrywiol) (Cymru) 2019)
1409	The Import and Export Licences (Amendment etc.) (EU Exit) Regulations 2019
1410	The Pesticides (Amendment) (EU Exit) Regulations 2019
1411	The A4042 Trunk Road (Llanellen, Monmouthshire) (Temporary Prohibition of Vehicles) Order 2019 (Note: This Order was also implemented in Welsh as Gorchymyn Cefnffordd yr A4042 (Llanelen, Sir Fynwy) (Gwahardd Cerbydau Dros Dro) 2019)
1412	The Air Navigation (Restriction of Flying) (Carlisle) (Emergency) (Revocation) Regulations 2019
1413	The A40 Trunk Road and Link Road (Travellers’ Rest, Carmarthenshire) (Temporary 30 MPH Speed Limit) & (Travellers' Rest Junction, Carmarthenshire) (Temporary Prohibition of Vehicles and 30 MPH Speed Limit) Orders 2018 (Revocation) Order 2019 (Note: This Order was also implemented in Welsh as Gorchymyn Gorchmynion Cefnffordd yr A40 a’r Ffordd Gyswllt (Travellers’ Rest, Sir Gaerfyrddin) (Terfyn Cyflymder 30 MYA Dros Dro) a (Cyffordd Travellers’ Rest, Sir Gaerfyrddin) (Gwahardd Cerbydau a Therfyn Cyflymder 30 MYA Dros Dro) 2018 (Dirymu) 2019)
1414	
1415	The A40 Trunk Road (Travellers Rest, Carmarthenshire) (50 mph & 30 mph Speed Limits) Order 2019 (Note: This Order was also implemented in Welsh as Gorchymyn Cefnffordd yr A40 (Travellers Rest, Sir Gaerfyrddin) (Terfynau Cyflymder 50 mya a 30 mya) 2019)
1416	The Over the Counter Derivatives, Central Counterparties and Trade Repositories (Amendment, etc., and Transitional Provision) (EU Exit) (No. 2) Regulations 2019
1417	The Pollution Prevention and Control (Designation of Directives) (England and Wales) Order 2019
1418	The Food Information (Wales) (Amendment) (EU Exit) Regulations 2019 (Note: This Order was also implemented in Welsh as Rheoliadau Gwybodaeth am Fwyd (Cymru) (Diwygio) (Ymadael â’r UE) 2019)
1419	The Firearms (Amendment) (No. 2) Rules 2019
1420	The Firearms Regulations 2019
1421	The Highways England Company Limited M11 Harlow North Junction (7A) (Slip Roads, Special Roads) Scheme 2018 Confirmation Instrument 2019
1422	The Common Organisation of the Markets in Agricultural Products and Common Agricultural Policy (Miscellaneous Amendments etc.) (EU Exit) (No. 2) Regulations 2019
1423	The European Union (Withdrawal) Act 2018 (Exit Day) (Amendment) (No. 3) Regulations 2019
1424	The Environment and Wildlife (Legislative Functions) (EU Exit) (Amendment) Regulations 2019
1425	The Finance Act 2004 (Specified Pension Schemes) Order 2019
1426	The Greater London Authority Elections (Amendment) Rules 2019
1427	The Insolvency Practitioners and Insolvency Services Account (Fees) (Amendment) Order 2019
1428	The M11 Motorway (Junctions 8 to 9) (Offside Lane Restriction) Regulations 2019
1429	The Cross-border Parcel Delivery Services (EU Information Requirements) Regulations 2019
1430	The M4 Motorway (Junctions 3 to 12) (Variable Speed Limits) Regulations 2019
1431	The Social Security, Child Benefit and Child Tax Credit (Amendment) (EU Exit) Regulations 2019
1432	The National Health Service Commissioning Board and Clinical Commissioning Groups (Responsibilities and Standing Rules) (Amendment) (No. 2) Regulations 2019
1433	The Occupational Pensions (Revaluation) Order 2019
1434	The Data Protection Act 2018 (Commencement No. 3) Regulations 2019
1435	The Greater London Authority (Consolidated Council Tax Requirement Procedure) Regulations 2019
1436	The Children and Social Work Act 2017 (Commencement No. 6 and Saving Provision) Regulations 2019
1437	
1438	The Scotland Act 2016 (Commencement No. 5) (Amendment) Regulations 2019
1439	The Scotland Act 2016 (Transitional) (Amendment) Regulations 2019
1440	The Greenhouse gas Emissions Trading Scheme (Amendment) (No. 3) Regulations 2019
1441	The Electricity and Gas (Energy Company Obligation) (Amendment) Order 2019
1442	The Eggs and Poultrymeat (England) (Amendment) Regulations 2019
1443	The Waste and Environmental Protection (Amendment) (Northern Ireland) (EU Exit) Regulations 2019
1444	The Network and Information Systems (Amendment etc.) (EU Exit) (No. 2) Regulations 2019
1445	The National Health Service (General Dental Services Contracts and Personal Dental Services Agreements) (Amendment) Regulations 2019
1446	The Terrorism Act 2000 (Proscribed Organisations) (Amendment) (No. 2) Order 2019
1447	The A465 Trunk Road (Ebbw Vale West Junction, Blaenau Gwent to Hardwick Roundabout, Monmouthshire) (Temporary Traffic Prohibitions and Restrictions) Order 2019 (Note: This Order was also implemented in Welsh as Gorchymyn Cefnffordd yr A465 (Cyffordd Gorllewin Glynebwy, Blaenau Gwent i Gylchfan Hardwick, Sir Fynwy) (Gwaharddiadau a Chyfyngiadau Traffig Dros Dro) 2019)
1448	The A44 Trunk Road (Llanbadarn Fawr, Ceredigion) (Temporary Prohibition of Vehicles, Cyclists and Pedestrians) Order 2019 (Note: This Order was also implemented in Welsh as Gorchymyn Cefnffordd yr A44 (Llanbadarn Fawr, Ceredigion) (Gwahardd Cerbydau, Beicwyr a Cherddwyr Dros Dro) 2019)
1449	The Local Government Pension Scheme (Amendment) Regulations 2019
1450	The Wireless Telegraphy (Mobile Repeater) (Exemption) (Amendment) Regulations 2019
1451	The Representation of the People (Annual Canvass) (Amendment) Regulations 2019
1452	The Income Tax (Trading and Other Income) Act 2005 (Amendments to Chapter 2A of Part 5) Regulations 2019
1453	The Agricultural Holdings (Units of Production) (England) (No. 2) Order 2019
1454	The Parliamentary Elections (Returning Officers’ Charges) Order 2019
1455	The Water Abstraction (Transitional Provisions) (Amendment) (England) Regulations 2019
1456	The A55 Trunk Road (Junction 9 (Treborth Interchange) to Junction 10 (Caernarfon Road Interchange), Bangor, Gwynedd) (Temporary Prohibition of Vehicles, Cyclists & Pedestrians) Order 2019 (Note: This Order was also implemented in Welsh as Gorchymyn Cefnffordd yr A55 (Cyffordd 9 (Cyfnewidfa Treborth) i Gyffordd 10 (Cyfnewidfa Ffordd Caernarfon), Bangor, Gwynedd) (Gwahardd Cerbydau, Beicwyr a Cherddwyr Dros Dro) 2019)
1457	The Newcastle Upon Tyne, North Tyneside and Northumberland Combined Authority (Adult Education Functions) Order 2019
1458	The Civil Partnership (Opposite-sex Couples) Regulations 2019
1459	The Insolvency (Amendment) (EU Exit) (No. 2) Regulations 2019
1460	The Church Representation and Ministers Measure 2019 (Commencement) Order 2019
1461	The Anguilla Constitution (Amendment) (No. 2) Order 2019
1462	The Air Navigation (Restriction of Flying) (River Blackwater) (Emergency) Regulations 2019
1463	The Air Navigation (Restriction of Flying) (River Blackwater) (Emergency) (Revocation) Regulations 2019
1464	The Tamar Bridge and Torpoint Ferry (Revision of Tolls and Traffic Classification) Order 2019
1465	The A487 Trunk Road (Corris Uchaf to Minffordd, Gwynedd) (Temporary Prohibition of Large Vehicles) Order 2019 (Note: This Order was also implemented in Welsh as Gorchymyn Cefnffordd yr A487 (Corris Uchaf i Finffordd, Gwynedd) (Gwahardd Cerbydau Mawr Dros Dro) 2019)
1466	The Renting Homes (Fees etc.) (Specified Information) (Wales) Regulations 2019 (Note: This Order was also implemented in Welsh as Rheoliadau Rhentu Cartrefi (Ffioedd etc.) (Gwybodaeth Benodedig) (Cymru) 2019)
1467	The Air Navigation (Restriction of Flying) (Portsmouth and The Solent) Regulations 2019
1468	The M6 Toll Motorway (M6 Junction 11A to M6 Toll Junction T8) (Staffordshire) (Temporary Prohibition of Traffic) Order 2019
1469	The Equality Act 2010 (Commencement No. 14) (Wales) Order 2019 (Note: This Order was also implemented in Welsh as Gorchymyn Deddf Cydraddoldeb 2010 (Cychwyn Rhif 14) (Cymru) 2019)
1470	The Parliamentary Elections (Returning Officers’ Charges) (Amendment) Order 2019
1471	The M6 Toll Motorway (M6 Toll Junction T8 to M6 Junction 11a, Staffordshire) (Temporary Prohibition of Traffic) Order 2019
1472	The Public Health (Minimum Price for Alcohol) (Minimum Unit Price) (Wales) Regulations 2019 (Note: This Order was also implemented in Welsh as Rheoliadau Iechyd y Cyhoedd (Isafbris am Alcohol) (Isafbris Uned) (Cymru) 2019)
1473	The Air Navigation (Restriction of Flying) (Watford) Regulations 2019
1474	The Fishery Products (Official Controls Charges) (England) (Amendment) Regulations 2019
1475	The Meat (Official Controls Charges) (England) (Amendment) Regulations 2019
1476	The Official Feed and Food Controls (England) (Miscellaneous Amendments) Regulations 2019
1477	The Non-Domestic Rating (Miscellaneous Provisions) (No. 2) (Amendment) (Wales) Regulations 2019 (Note: This Order was also implemented in Welsh as Rheoliadau Ardrethu Annomestig (Darpariaethau Amrywiol) (Rhif 2) (Diwygio) (Cymru) 2019)
1478	The A449 & A40 Trunk Roads (Coldra Interchange, Newport to the Wales/England Border, Monmouthshire) (Temporary Traffic Prohibitions & Restrictions) Order 2019 (Note: This Order was also implemented in Welsh as Gorchymyn Cefnffyrdd yr A449 a’r A40 (Cyfnewidfa Coldra, Casnewydd i Ffin Cymru/Lloegr, Sir Fynwy) (Gwaharddiadau a Chyfyngiadau Traffig Dros Dro) 2019)
1479	The Housing (Wales) Act 2014 (Commencement No. 10) Order 2019 (Note: This Order was also implemented in Welsh as Gorchymyn Deddf Tai (Cymru) 2014 (Cychwyn Rhif 10) 2019)
1480	The Meat (Official Controls Charges) (Wales) (Amendment) Regulations 2019 (Note: This Order was also implemented in Welsh as Rheoliadau Cig (Ffioedd Rheolaethau Swyddogol) (Cymru) (Diwygio) 2019)
1481	The Fishery Products (Official Controls Charges) (Wales) (Amendment) Regulations 2019 (Note: This Order was also implemented in Welsh as Rheoliadau Cynhyrchion Pysgodfeydd (Taliadau Rheolaethau Swyddogol) (Cymru) (Diwygio) 2019)
1482	The Official Feed and Food Controls (Wales) (Miscellaneous Amendments) Regulations 2019 (Note: This Order was also implemented in Welsh as Rheoliadau Rheolaethau Swyddogol ar Fwyd Anifeiliaid a Bwyd (Cymru) (Diwygiadau Amrywiol) 2019)
1483	The Government of Wales Act 2006 (Budget Motions and Designated Bodies) (Amendment) Order 2019 (Note: This Order was also implemented in Welsh as Gorchymyn Deddf Llywodraeth Cymru 2006 (Cynigion Cyllidebol a Chyrff Dynodedig) (Diwygio) 2019)
1484	The Air Navigation (Restriction of Flying) (Lea Valley and Central London) (No. 2) Regulations 2019
1485	The Air Navigation (Restriction of Flying) (Southwark) (Emergency) Regulations 2019
1486	The Air Navigation (Restriction of Flying) (Southwark) (Emergency) (Revocation) Regulations 2019
1487	The A4076 Trunk Road (Hamilton Terrace, Milford Haven, Pembrokeshire) (Temporary Prohibition of Vehicles) Order 2019 (Note: This Order was also implemented in Welsh as Gorchymyn Cefnffordd yr A4076 (Hamilton Terrace, Aberdaugleddau, Sir Benfro) (Gwahardd Cerbydau Dros Dro) 2019)
1488	The Official Controls (Animals, Feed and Food, Plant Health Fees etc.) Regulations 2019
1489	The Welsh in Education Strategic Plans (Wales) Regulations 2019 (Note: This Order was also implemented in Welsh as Rheoliadau Cynlluniau Strategol Cymraeg mewn Addysg (Cymru) 2019)
1490	The Public Interest Merger Reference (Gardner Aerospace Holdings Ltd. and Impcross Ltd.) (Pre-emptive Action) Order 2019
1491	The A55 Trunk Road (Penmaenbach Tunnel, Conwy County Borough) (Temporary Traffic Prohibitions & Restrictions) Order 2019 (Note: This Order was also implemented in Welsh as Gorchymyn Cefnffordd yr A55 (Twnnel Penmaen-bach, Bwrdeistref Sirol Conwy) (Gwaharddiadau a Chyfyngiadau Traffig Dros Dro) 2019)
1492	The Genetically Modified Organisms (Deliberate Release and Transboundary Movement) (Miscellaneous Amendments) (Wales) (EU Exit) (No. 2) Regulations 2019 (Note: This Order was also implemented in Welsh as Rheoliadau Organeddau a Addaswyd yn Enetig (Eu Gollwng yn Fwriadol a’u Symud ar draws Ffin) (Diwygiadau Amrywiol) (Cymru) (Ymadael â’r UE) (Rhif 2) 2019)
1493	The Renting Homes (Fees etc.) (Holding Deposit) (Specified Information) (Wales) Regulations 2019 (Note: This Order was also implemented in Welsh as Rheoliadau Rhentu Cartrefi (Ffioedd etc.) (Blaendal Cadw) (Gwybodaeth Benodedig) (Cymru) 2019)
1494	The Air Navigation (Restriction of Flying) (Scapa Flow) (Emergency) Regulations 2019
1495	The Air Navigation (Restriction of Flying) (Scapa Flow) (Emergency) (Revocation) Regulations 2019
1496	The Air Navigation (Restriction of Flying) (New Year's Eve, London) Regulations 2019
1497	The Non-Domestic Rating (Multiplier) (Wales) Order 2019 (Note: This Order was also implemented in Welsh as Gorchymyn Ardrethu Annomestig (Lluosydd) (Cymru) 2019)
1498	The Whelk Fishing (Wales) (Amendment) Order 2019
1499	The Building (Amendment) (Wales) Regulations 2019
1500	The A55 Trunk Road (Junction 2 (Tŷ Mawr Interchange), Holyhead, Anglesey to Junction 11 (Llys y Gwynt Interchange), Bangor, Gwynedd) (Temporary Prohibition of Vehicles, Cyclists & Pedestrians) Order 2019 (Note: This Order was also implemented in Welsh as Gorchymyn Cefnffordd yr A55 (Cyffordd 2 (Cyfnewidfa Tŷ Mawr), Caergybi, Ynys Môn i Gyffordd 11 (Cyfnewidfa Llys y Gwynt), Bangor, Gwynedd) (Gwahardd Cerbydau, Beicwyr a Cherddwyr Dros Dro) 2019)

== 1501–1518 ==
Number	Title
1501	The Revised Code of Practice on the exercise of social services functions in relation to Part 10 (Advocacy) of the Social Services and Well-being (Wales) Act 2014 (Appointed Day) (Wales) Order 2019 (Note: This Order was also implemented in Welsh as Gorchymyn y Cod Ymarfer Diwygiedig ar arfer swyddogaethau gwasanaethau cymdeithasol mewn perthynas â Rhan 10 (Eirioli) o Ddeddf Gwasanaethau Cymdeithasol a Llesiant (Cymru) 2014 (Diwrnod Penodedig) (Cymru) 2019)
1502	The A487 & A40 Trunk Roads (Fishguard, Pembrokeshire) (Temporary Prohibition of Vehicles) Order 2019 (Note: This Order was also implemented in Welsh as Gorchymyn Cefnffyrdd yr A487 a’r A40 (Abergwaun, Sir Benfro) (Gwahardd Cerbydau Dros Dro) 2019)
1503	Air Navigation (Restriction of Flying) (State Opening of Parliament) (No. 2) Regulations 2019
1504	The Fire and Rescue Services (Appointment of Inspector) (Wales) Order 2019
1505	The Education (Inspectors of Education and Training in Wales) Order 2019
1506	The Government of Wales Act 2006 (Amendment) Order 2019
1507	The Value Added Tax (Place of Supply of Goods) (Amendment) Order 2019
1508	The Non-Domestic Rating (Small Business Relief) (Wales) (Amendment) Order 2019 (Note: This Order was also implemented in Welsh as Gorchymyn Ardrethu Annomestig (Rhyddhad Ardrethi i Fusnesau Bach) (Cymru) (Diwygio) 2019)
1509	The Value Added Tax (Amendment) (No. 2) Regulations 2019
1510	The Excise Goods (Holding, Movement and Duty Point) (Amendment) Regulations 2019
1511	The Money laundering and Terrorist Financing (Amendment) Regulations 2019
1512	The Turkey (Asset-Freezing) Regulations 2019
1513	The M42 Motorway (Junction 7a to Junction 9) and M6 Toll Motorway (M6 Junction 3a to M6 Toll Junction T2) (Warwickshire) (Temporary Prohibition of Traffic) Order 2019
1514	The Marriage (Same-sex Couples) and Civil Partnership (Opposite-sex Couples) (Northern Ireland) Regulations 2019
1515	The Public Interest Merger Reference (Mettis Aerospace Ltd.) (Pre-emptive Action) Order 2019
1516	The Designation of Rural Primary Schools (England) Order 2019
1517	The Official Controls (Plant Health and Genetically Modified Organisms) (England) Regulations 2019
1518	The A55 Trunk Road (Conwy Tunnel, Conwy County Borough) (Temporary Traffic Prohibitions and Restrictions) Order 2019 (Note: This Order was also implemented in Welsh as Gorchymyn Cefnffordd yr A55 (Twnnel Conwy, Bwrdeistref Sirol Conwy) (Gwaharddiadau a Chyfyngiadau Traffig Dros Dro) 2019)

== See also ==
- List of acts of the Parliament of the United Kingdom from 2019
- List of statutory instruments of the United Kingdom, 2016
- List of statutory instruments of the United Kingdom, 2017
- List of statutory instruments of the United Kingdom, 2018
- List of statutory instruments of the United Kingdom, 2020
