= Kids Web Services =

British age verification service owned by Epic Games

- Developer: SuperAwesome (2015-2024); Epic Games (2024-present)
- Type: Age verification
- Launched: June 2015
- Status: Active
- Website: www.kidswebservices.com

Kids Web Services (KWS) is a British online age verification service operated as a subsidiary of Epic Games.

Kids Web Services was developed as a parental consent management toolkit in June 2015 by London-based start-up company SuperAwesome, which in 2020 received indirect financial backing from Microsoft. SuperAwesome was acquired by Epic Games later that year. When SuperAwesome was demerged in a management buyout in January 2024, KWS was retained by Epic Games.

In July 2025, social media company Bluesky began requiring users in the UK to register with KWS in order to access certain features, in response to the Online Safety Act 2023.

Reviewers including Rupert Goodwins of The Register and Simon McGarr of The Gist have criticised the service for the amount of personal data gathered, and for the fact that such data could be acquired by an as-yet unknown third party if ever the business is sold.
