= Children's Wellbeing and Schools Act 2026 =

UK child protection law

Children’s Wellbeing and Schools Act 2026 (Note: Section 79.)
- Act of Parliament
- Parliament of the United Kingdom
- Long title: An Act to make provision about the safeguarding and welfare of children; about support for children in care or leaving care; about regulation of care workers; about regulation of establishments and agencies under Part 2 of the Care Standards Act 2000; about employment of children; about breakfast club provision and school uniform; about attendance of children at school; about regulation of independent educational institutions; about inspections of schools and colleges; about teacher misconduct; about Academies and teachers at Academies; repealing section 128 of the Education Act 2002; about school places and admissions; about establishing new schools; and for connected purposes.
- Citation: 2026 c. 21
- Introduced by: Bridget Phillipson (Commons); Baroness Smith of Malvern (Lords)
- Territorial extent: England and Wales; Scotland; Northern Ireland; (Note: Section 77.)

Dates
- Royal assent: 29 April 2026
- Commencement: Various (Note: Section 78.)
Other legislation
Amends	Education Act 1996; Education Act 2002; Children and Social Work Act 2017

Status: Current legislation

History of passage through Parliament

Text of statute as originally enacted

Revised text of statute as amended

The Children's Wellbeing and Schools Act 2026, also referred to as the Schools Bill during passage, is an act of the Parliament of the United Kingdom aimed at enhancing the welfare and education standards for children in the United Kingdom. This Bill introduces a range of measures designed to safeguard children, support those in care, and improve the overall quality of education.

== Background ==
The bill was introduced by the Department for Education and is part of the government's broader strategy to ensure the safety and well-being of children. It was first announced in the King's Speech during the 2023 State Opening of Parliament. The bill aims to address various issues, including the regulation of care workers, the employment of children, and the provision of school services such as breakfast clubs and school uniforms.

== Outline ==
The bill mandates local authorities to offer family group decision-making for families with children on the verge of going into care. Additionally, the bill includes provisions for better support for children leaving care, ensuring they have the necessary resources and guidance to transition smoothly into adulthood.

Furthermore, the bill addresses the provision of school services such as breakfast clubs and school uniforms, ensuring that all children have access to these services to support their education and well-being. The bill includes measures to improve school attendance and the regulation of independent educational institutions. It also proposes more rigorous inspections of schools and colleges. Other provisions include ensuring all schools have allergy safety policies and a number of provisions relating to home schooling, such as parents or guardians seeking approval from their local council to home school children, the council assessing suitability, providing educational assistance if requested, and keeping a register of children being educated outside of schools.

The legislation also amends the Online Safety Act 2023, granting the Secretary of State the ability to introduce secondary legislation that would allow the government to compel providers of certain internet services (such as social media platforms) to age restrict, and otherwise restrict, their services in order to prevent children experiencing harm. Mobile phone usage in schools is also restricted.

== Parliamentary passage ==
The bill received its first reading in the House of Commons on 5 November 2024, and its second reading on 26 November 2024, where it was passed with a significant majority. It was then sent to a Public Bill Committee, which debated the Bill and reported it with amendments on 30 January 2025. The Bill successfully passed its third reading on 18 March 2025, with 382 votes in favour and 104 against.

It then progressed to the House of Lords, where it received its first reading on 19 March. The second reading was held on 1 May, after which it progressed to the committee stage and report stage, followed by the third reading on 9 February 2026.

== Benedict's Law ==
In July 2026, an Allergy Safety amendment, more commonly known as Benedict's Law, was added to the Act which requires every school in England to hold spare adrenaline auto-injectors and provide compulsory allergy and anaphylaxis training for all staff. It is named for Benedict Blythe, who died in 2021, aged five, after an allergic reaction to cow's milk at school.

== Reactions ==
The bill has garnered support from various health and education organizations, including the Royal College of Paediatrics and Child Health. Public opinion has also been largely favourable, with substantial support for the measures aimed at improving children's welfare and education standards.

However it has garnered objections from experts in safeguarding, child development, faith leaders, parents, home educators, and children.
