= Utah Social Media Regulation Act =

Utah State Legislature
- Long title: S.B. 152 and H.B. 311
- Signed by: Spencer Cox
- Signed: March 23, 2023
- Status: Blocked

S.B. 152 and H.B. 311, collectively known as the Utah Social Media Regulation Act, were social media regulation bills that were passed by the Utah State Legislature in March 2023. The bills would have collectively imposed restrictions on how social networking services serve minors in the state of Utah, including mandatory age verification and age restrictions, as well as restrictions on data collection and on algorithmic recommendations.

The Act was intended to take effect in March 2024. However, following a lawsuit over the Act by NetChoice, a tech industry lobby group, the Utah attorney general stated in January 2024 that its implementation had been delayed to October 2024, but was likely to be repealed and amended. On September 10, 2024 Chief Judge Robert J. Shelby issued a written order granting a request from NetChoice for a preliminary injunction, meaning that Utah will be unable to enforce its social media law as litigation plays out. The law was appealed to the 10th Circuit on October 11, 2024 and is awaiting a decision.

== Provisions ==
The Act comprises two bills, S.B. 152 and H.B. 311, which respectively regulate access to social network accounts registered to minors, and impose obligations on social networking services to follow design practices that protect the privacy of minors. The bills would apply to social networks with more than 5 million active users in the United States.

Social networking services would've verified the age of all users in the state of Utah, or else their account must've been deleted. The Act does not specify a specific method of age verification. Users who are under 18 must have consent from a parent or guardian to open an account, and the parent must be able to have access to the account and its data for monitoring.

Unless required to comply with state or federal law, social networks were prohibited from collecting data based on the activity of minors, and may've not displayed targeted advertising or algorithmic recommendations of content, users, or groups to minors. A social network must not allow minors to access the service between the hours of 10:30 p.m., and 6:30 a.m. without parental consent. H.B. 311 prohibits social networks from exposing features to minors that cause them to have an "addiction" to the platform; the service must perform quarterly audits, and may be sued by users for harms caused by providing "addictive" features; there is a rebuttable presumption of harm if the plaintiff is 16 or younger.

The bills prescribed fines of $2,500 per-violation for violations of the provisions of S.B. 152, and up to $250,000 in liabilities (plus fines of $2,500 per-user) for violations of the addiction rules.

== History ==
The two bills were passed in early-March 2023, and signed by Governor Spencer Cox on March 23, 2023. Cox cited studies linking social media addiction to increases in depression and suicide among youth. They were originally intended to take effect on March 1, 2024. In the wake of a lawsuit in Arkansas by the trade association NetChoice over a similar bill, state senator and bill author Mike McKell stated that he planned to introduce amendments when the legislature resumed in 2024.

In December 2023, NetChoice filed a lawsuit in Utah seeking to block the Act, citing that its definition of a social network was too vague, and that it "restricts who can express themselves, what can be said, and when and how speech on covered websites can occur, down to the very hours of the day minors can use covered websites. The First Amendment, reinforced by decades of precedent, allows none of this." In regards to its age verification requirements, NetChoice argued that "it may not be enough to simply verify the age of whatever person may be listed on a form of identification (even if they have such a record) because that record may not accurately reflect who the individual actually is." The office of the attorney general stated that the state was "reviewing the lawsuit but remains intently focused on the goal of this legislation: Protecting young people from negative and harmful effects of social media use."

In January 2024, Attorney General Sean Reyes asked the court to delay a hearing over the bill, stating that its effective date had been delayed to October 2024, and that the legislature planned to repeal and replace the bills.

On September 10, 2024, Federal Chief Judge Robert Shelby granted a preliminary injunction to stop enforcement of the law as litigation continues. The law was later appealed on October 11, 2024, by the state of Utah and had a court hearing on the appeal on November 20, 2025.

== See also ==
- Age appropriate design code
- Virginia Senate Bill 854
- Parental Rights in Social Media Act
- NetChoice v. Jones
- NetChoice v. Weiser
