= NetChoice v. Fitch =

Ongoing U.S. lawsuit

NetChoice v. Fitch is the lawsuit that is in the Fifth Circuit Court of Appeals challenging an internet law in Mississippi by the name of the Walker Montgomery Protecting Children Online Act. The bill had passed out of Mississippi's State House and Senate unanimously and had bipartisan support. It then was signed by Mississippi Governor Tate Reeves on April 30, 2024, and was originally intended to take effect on July 1, 2024.

== Law being Challenged ==
The law being challenged requires digital service providers to verify the age of all users on their service by making commercially reasonable efforts to verify the age of all their users and if that user is under 18 years of age, they must have parental consent which can done by providing a form for the parent or legal guardian of a minor to sign, providing a toll-free phone number to call, coordinating a call with the parent or guardian of a minor, providing an email for the parent or guardian to respond to or any other commercially reasonable method of obtaining consent.

The law requires digital service providers to then delete any information collected by the age verification process once they have confirmed the identity of the minor's parent or guardian. Digital service providers are also required to limit their collection or selling of a minor's personal or geolocation data and cannot show personalized advertisements that involve harmful material to minors, they are also required to limit a minor's exposure to content that promotes or facilitates harms such as physical violence, online bullying, eating disorders, grooming or trafficking.

Violating the law is considered an unfair or deceptive trade practice and violating under 75-24-5 of Mississippi code an unfair or deceptive trade practice under Mississippi law under 75-24-5 can result in fines that are up to 10,000 dollars per violation or Imprisonment of up to 1 year or a fine that is up to 1,000 dollars or both, and if the person has been convicted three or more times in the past five years that will be charged with a felony and will be sentenced to not less than 1 years of imprisonment and not more than 5 years of imprisonment.

== U.S District Court for the Southern District Court of Mississippi ==
NetChoice, LLC v. Fitch
- Court: U.S District Court for the Southern District of Mississippi
- Full case name: NetChoice, LLC v. Lynn Fitch in her official capacity as the Attorney General of Mississippi
- Argued: June 26, 2024
- Decided: July 1, 2024
- Docket nos.: 1:24-cv-00170

Holding
- HB 1126 is subject to strict scrutiny under the first amendment to the United States Constitution meaning it must serve a compelling government interest , be narrowly tailored and be the least restrictive means. The law serves a compelling government interest, however is both under and overinclusive making inappropriately tailored and isn't the least restrictive means.

Court membership
- Chief judge: Halil Suleyman Ozerden

On June 7, 2024, the trade association NetChoice sued Mississippi Attorney General Lynn Fitch in Federal District Court for the Southern District of Mississippi. In the complaint NetChoice claimed that the law violates "bedrock" principles of constitutional law and that the law violates the First Amendment rights of both minors and adults and is preempted by Section 230 because the law requires services to verify the age of users and must "prevent and mitigate" exposure to a list of vaguely defined societal ills and claim that the list of content to prevent and mitigate is so vague that anything from Romeo and Juliet to movies like Despicable Me and Home Alone could be censored because of the law. The same day they made their complaint they filed a motion for a Preliminary Injunction and Temporary Restraining Order.

There would later be a Hearing on NetChoice's motion for a Preliminary Injunction and Temporary Restraining Order on June 26, 2024.

The law was later enjoined by Judge Halil Suleyman Ozerden on July 1, 2024 noting that the law was subject to strict scrutiny and failed it.

== Fifth Circuit Court of Appeals ==
NetChoice, LLC v. Fitch
- Court: U.S Court of Appeals for the Fifth Circuit
- Full case name: NetChoice, LLC, Appellee v. Lynn Fitch in her official capacity as Attorney General of Mississippi, Appellant
- Argued: February 4, 2025
- Decided: April 17, 2025
- Docket nos.: 24-60341

Court membership
- Judges sitting: Patrick Higginbotham, Don Willett and James Ho

Case opinions
- Decision by: Patrick Higginbotham joined by Don Willett
- Concurrence: James Ho

On July 5, 2024, Mississippi appealed the case to the Fifth Circuit Court of Appeals.

The Fifth Circuit would then hear the case on February 4, 2025, and would make their ruling on April 17, 2025, vacating the District Court's injunction because the court did not review the law correctly when reviewing it and granting the injunction.

== Supreme Court ==
NetChoice's request for the court to block the law was denied.
