= Persona Identities =

American identity verification company

Persona Identities, Inc.
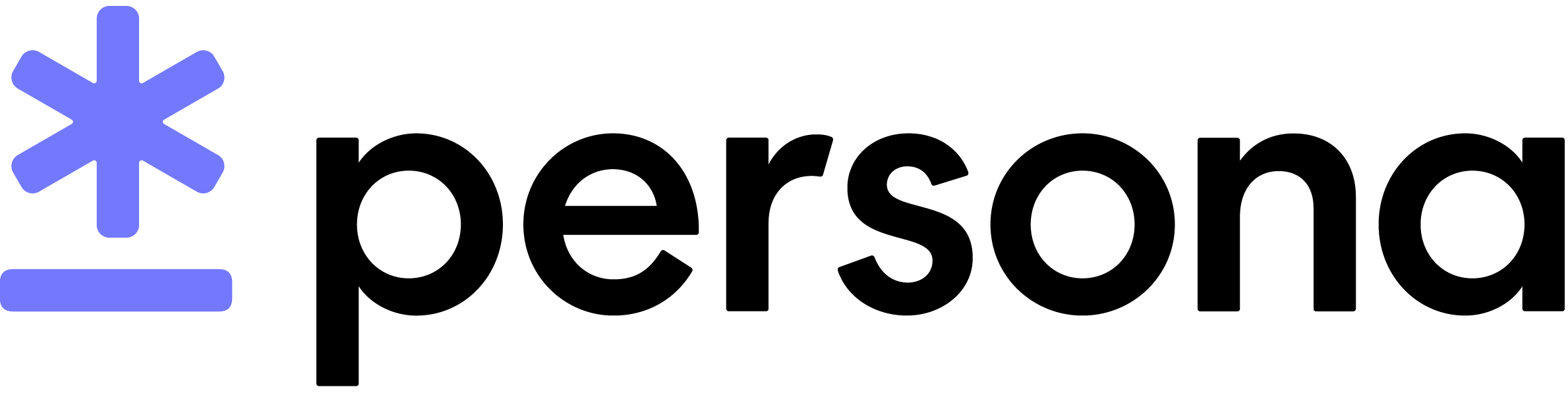
- Type: Private
- Industry: Software
- Founded: October 2018; 8 years ago
- Founders: Rick Song; Charles Yeh
- Headquarters: San Francisco, California, United States
- Services: Identity verification
- Website: withpersona.com

Persona Identities, Inc. is an American identity verification company headquartered in San Francisco. The company develops infrastructure for businesses to verify individuals and organizations, manage user onboarding, and comply with know your customer (KYC), anti–money laundering (AML), or age verification regulations.

== History ==
The company was founded in 2018 by Charles Yeh and Rick Song, who were former engineers at Dropbox and Square, respectively. Persona was originally positioned as providing identity verification to prevent fraud. Song explained that "we found identity was critical for anything from account recovery to verifying for fraud, or building trust and safety for a delivery, to ensuring there's trust between two peers for transferring money." In contrast to other identity management vendors, the company did not focus on a specific industry, with its initial clients ranging from fintech companies to food delivery and short-term rental providers.

Persona has raised capital from Founders Fund and other venture-capital firms and investors; in September 2021, the company was valued at $1.5 billion after a series C round. In May 2025, the company raised $200 million in a series D round, reaching a valuation of $2 billion.

== Products and services ==
Persona’s platform provides document and biometric identity verification for compliance with know your customer (KYC) and anti–money laundering (AML) regulations. Its technologies also include proprietary selfie "liveness" checks. Publicly-exposed code found by a security researcher in February 2026 determined that the platform was capable of up to 269 individual checks grouped into 14 categories, A Persona representative stated to Malwarebytes that none of its customers used all 269 checks at once.

In October 2023, Persona introduced "Reusable Personas" to allow secured storage of verified identity information using a Passkey-based credential.

Persona has increasingly been used for age verification to comply with voluntary and mandatory age assurance requirements for social media services and adult content, including the United Kingdom's Online Safety Act 2023 and Australia's Online Safety Amendment (Social Media Minimum Age) Act 2024, and various state-level legislation in the United States.

== Reception and privacy concerns ==
Persona and other third‑party age verification providers have been cited in broader debates about the privacy and security implications of online age checks. News coverage of Reddit’s UK rollout focused on short photo retention windows and the separation of user account data from verification data, while also highlighting civil liberties concerns about expanding age restrictions online. Founders Fund's investment in Persona has been scrutinized in broader discussions of government surveillance and identity verification technologies due to its ties to Peter Thiel, the founder of data-analytics company Palantir. Song has denied operational relationships between Persona and Palantir or U.S. government agencies.

In February 2026, a security researcher discovered publicly-exposed code on an instance of Persona's verification system used by the U.S. government's Federal Risk and Authorization Management Program (FedRAMP), which revealed information about the company's verification pipeline. The discovery led to further evaluations of Persona's operations; the messaging service Discord stated that it would end its trial use of Persona for age verification in certain territories, and evaluate alternative providers and methods.

== See also ==
- Regulatory technology
