= Yubo =

French social networking platform

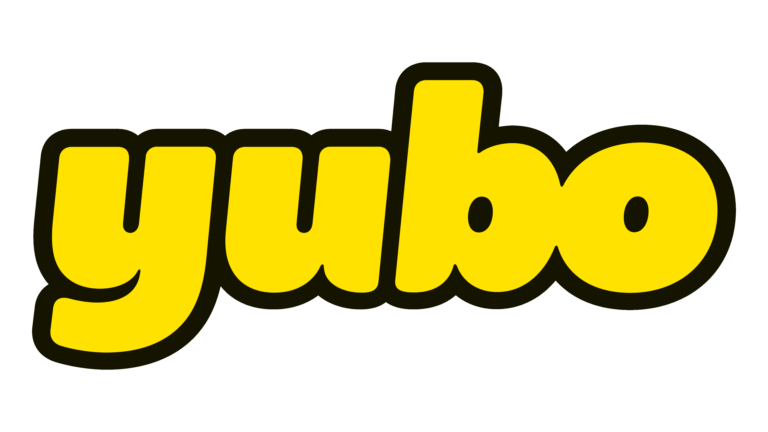
- A logo with black outline and yellow letters
- Developer: Twelve APP
- Operating system: iOS & Android
- Available in: English; Spanish; Portuguese; Italian; Polish; French; German; Norwegian; Dutch; Finnish; Swedish
- Website: yubo.live/en

Yubo (formerly known as Yellow) is a French social networking platform and app developed by Twelve APP in 2015. It is designed to "meet new people" and "create a sense of community". The app claims to have 85 million users as of 2025.

== History ==
Yubo was created by Sacha Lazimi, Jérémie Aouate, and Arthur Patora when they were engineering students at CentraleSupélec Graduate school of the Paris-Saclay University and Télécom Paris, and it was first launched with the name "Yellow" in 2015. According to the founders, the app seeks to create a space for "socializing online" and to "facilitate communication between people all over the world who share mutual interests."

In December 2019, the app raised $12.3 million (€11.2 million) in a funding round led by French private equity firms like Iris Capital, Idinvest Partners, Alven, Sweet Capital, and Village Global. The funds will be used to develop its technology and expand its global user base.

Between 2015 and December 2019, app users created an estimated 2 billion friendships, along with exchanging more than 10 billion messages and launching 30 million livestreams.

In 2019, the startup generated $10 million in revenue.

In 2020, in the context of the COVID-19 pandemic, Yubo recorded a significant rise in use due to quarantined teenagers, with a 550% increase in time spent in video discussion groups. During this period, Yubo doubled the number of new daily signups, which reached 30,000 per day in mid-April. As of October 2020, the app had 40 million users worldwide, 60% of whom are Americans and Canadians.

In September 2020, Yubo established its U.S. headquarters in Jacksonville, Florida. At the same time, Yubo opened a new office in London. In November 2020, Yubo carried out a new fundraising, raising $47.5 million (€40 million) from its historical investors and a new entrant, Gaia Capital Partner. The announced objective is, in particular, to strengthen moderation and develop the Asian market. In addition, Jerry Murdock, co-founder of Insight Partners, who invested in Twitter and Snapchat, joined the board of directors of Yubo.

In December 2020, Yubo, through its partnership with Snapchat, introduced the AR lenses from Snap Inc. A camera kit was included directly in the app.

In November 2021, Yubo opened a second office in New York City.

Following the Robb Elementary School shooting on 24 May 2022 in Uvalde, Texas, the app came under criticism for failing to remove the perpetrator's profile from their platform quickly, leaving the profile up for four days after the shooting. Multiple witnesses reported that Ramos boasted about purchasing a firearm and posted threatening messages weeks before the tragic event occurred.

In 2023, a tool operated by the National Center for Missing & Exploited Children and funded by Meta Platforms called "Take It Down" was released. The participating platforms, including Yubo, OnlyFans, Facebook, Instagram , and Pornhub, agreed to remove non-consensual images or videos that users flag with the tool. The program relies on users uploading hashes of images and cannot identify edited versions of the image.

== Features ==
=== Core functionalities ===
==== Live streaming ====
Live streaming video is the main feature of the app. Each session can host up to ten streamers with an unlimited number of viewers. Streamers can only join a session room if they are invited by another streamer or if they create it. Viewers can send comments to interact with the streamers. Viewers and streamers can become friends. Viewers can also choose the live they want to join based on a variety of topics or the nationality of the participants.

The app includes a swiping feature, similar to the dating app Tinder, to swipe on other people's profiles with similar age and messaging features. Users can choose to see only profiles with a specific location or specific gender. Unlike many social networks, Yubo does not offer a "like" function on its app, and the app is not based on the "followers" count.

==== Gender and pronouns ====
For Pride Month of 2021, Yubo has added 35 new gender options for users to identify with on the app. The list has been compiled with the UK NGO Mermaids.

==== Pixels ====
In Mid-July 2021, Yubo launched its Pixels collection. This was a collaboration with pixel artist Banfan to create collectible digital art representing qualities, moods, and personalities. Yubo users are able to purchase these in-app and can start their own collection or send them to their friends.

==== YuBucks ====
In July 2021, Yubo launched its Virtual currency. The application's business model is based on an in-app microtransaction system and not advertisements. Available in the Yubo store, YuBucks can be purchased in packs or via a weekly or monthly subscription system. Yubo is based around microtransactions , which allow users to, for example, give more visibility to their profiles.

==== Add by tag ====
Tags are categories that allow users to share their interests. In November 2021, Yubo launched Add by Tag. Using the feature, users can search for people with specific tags to find friends.

==== Verification of profiles ====
The app requires users to enter their date of birth, name, gender identity, mobile number, and a photo clearly showing their face, using age-estimation to verify a user`s age, with additional verification required if a user looks older than their stated date of birth to prevent younger users from contacting adults. Additionally, users can use a selfie and/or photo identification to prove their real age.

== Safety ==
In 2018, Yubo joined the eSafety Commissioner's Tier 1 social media scheme in Australia for resolving cyberbullying.

Yubo had increased media attention after the app became popular in 2019. It was quickly deemed "Tinder for Teens" by several online resources as Yubo highlights a swiping feature similar to the popular dating app. There have been several cases of predatory behavior, grooming, child pornography, and exploitation of minors in relation to the app.

Yubo entered into a partnership with Yoti in February 2019 to use their age estimation technology to analyze faces and estimate how old users are. The company claims it has checked more than 22 million profile pictures and removed profiles belonging to under-13s as a result. Yubo has since placed further safeguards on the app, such as a proactive "engage and educate" approach for their community, a mix between AI and human moderators, banning sexually explicit profile content, and auto-blocking fake profiles. However, there is still a possibility for users to create fake profiles containing images of minors as an attempt to hide their true identity.

In 2020, Yubo announced a partnership with the National Center for Missing & Exploited Children (NCMEC) to enhance the safety of its young users, implementing advanced reporting tools and moderation measures to prevent the sharing of inappropriate or exploitative content. Yubo began sharing data in the event of "suspected illegal activity involving minors". Yubo also implemented an algorithm that scans livestreams. If the algorithm detects inappropriate content in a livestream, the livestream is automatically removed. An independent report on child sexual abuse in the United Kingdom estimates that "the value of human moderation is evident from the success achieved by the social network Yubo, whose moderators interrupt livestreams to tell underage users to put their clothes on". NCMEC took on an advisory position at the company. Yubo's Safety Board's existing includes:

- Annie Mullins – Independent Safety Advisor, Yubo
- John Shehan – Vice President, National Center for Missing & Exploited Children (NCMEC)
- Alex Holmes – Deputy CEO, The Diana Award
- Travis Bright – Product Director, Thorn
- Mick Moran – Garda Liaison Officer, Paris, former Deputy Director INTERPOL
- Richard Graham – Consultant Child and Adolescent Psychiatrist and Clinical Director, Good Thinking
- Anne Collier – Founder of Family Net News & Exec Director of The Net Safety Collaborative (TNSC)

In February 2021, Yubo launched pop-up alerts in an attempt to prevent inappropriate requests in private chat. When a user is about to share private information, such as their phone number or location, they receive a pop-up message warning them of the risks of sharing private information.

In July 2021, Yubo was updated with the Muted Words feature. Users can choose any word, abbreviation, or emoji that they find offensive to them, and content containing that information would be hidden from the user. Users are also able to choose from whom to mute the words – they can block all users or just those who are not in their friends list. Then the comments with these words will be automatically hidden from the user's view.

Between 2018 and 2023, there were twenty cases of child sexual abuse in Swedish courts where the perpetrator and the victim met through Yubo.

=== Uvalde shooting ===
Salvador Rolando Ramos, the perpetrator of the 2022 Uvalde school shooting, was an active user of the Yubo app. During the months leading up to the massacre, fellow users reported Ramos's account dozens of times for behaviors that included bullying, hate speech, animal cruelty, sexual harassment, rape threats, death threats, and threats of gun violence. Despite the reports, no action was taken by the platform, and Ramos's account remained active. Yubo faced media criticism for its lack of action before the shooting and continued criticism when the company issued a message of condolence and stated it was investigating "an account that has since been banned from the platform." Media outlets later confirmed Ramos's profile remained publicly accessible up to four days after the attack. The profile wasn't fully removed from the platform until Yubo was contacted by journalists asking for comment.
