= Ban on social media =

Ban on social media or Social media ban may refer to:

- Ban (Internet)
- Online age verification laws by country
- Online Safety Amendment (Social Media Minimum Age) Act 2024, Australia's world-first legislation to ban under-16s from social media
- Social media age verification laws in the United States

== See also ==
- Media regulation
- Social media regulation
