= Ageless Linux =

Protest Linux distribution opposing age verification laws

- Version of the Debian operating system
- Developer: John McCardle/FFwF Robotics
- Working state: Current
- Source model: Open source
- Repository: github.com/agelesslinux/agelesslinux
- Official website: agelesslinux.org
- Tagline: "Software for humans of indeterminate age"

Ageless Linux is a Debian-based Linux distribution created as an act of political protest against age verification. The Ageless Linux project also builds hardware designed to provide computing devices resistant to age checks.

== Software ==
Ageless Linux was written by software and hardware developer John McCardle and released in March 2026. According to the project, "We track how Linux distributions are responding to age verification mandates, and we provide tools to undo whatever they implement. If a distribution adds an age collection prompt, we will publish a script that removes it. If it ships a D-Bus age verification daemon, we will publish a package that replaces it with silence."

Technically, Ageless Linux consists of scripts that change the name of the operating system of a Debian installation to "Ageless Linux." The developer points out that the California Digital Age Assurance Act does not specify minimum technical requirements, so Ageless Linux is arguably a different distribution subject to, but dismissive of, age-collection compliance according to the law. The act mandates that operating system developers collect user age information and inform application developers of that age when the user downloads the application.

== Hardware ==
The Ageless Linux project also has a hardware component, which it describes as "A physical computing device designed to satisfy every element of the California Digital Age Assurance Act's regulatory scope while deliberately refusing to comply with its requirements. The device costs less than lunch and will be handed to children." The project produces three levels of hardware (of which none are currently available), the simplest of which is a $6 bootable Linux device with a display, network connectivity, and an app store.

== Discussion ==
Ben Werdmuller, Senior Director of Technology at ProPublica, has noted that "while age verification laws are ostensibly being proposed to protect children, they create an authentication layer that deanonymizes the internet." He expressed hope that Ageless Linux would play a part in defeating such laws, calling the project "Open source activism at its finest."

== See also ==
- GrapheneOS § Opposition to age verification legislation
