= Yoti =

British digital identity company

- Founded: 2014
- Headquarters: London, England, United Kingdom
- Website: www.yoti.com

Yoti is a British company headquartered in London that operates age verification and digital identity services. The company was founded in 2014 by Duncan Francis, Noel Hayden, and Robin Tombs.

Yoti offers a facial age estimation service, which uses artificial intelligence to estimate whether an individual is over a specified age threshold without requiring the storage of identity documents. Its clients include many pornography websites, where the software is used to help operators comply with UK age-assurance and online safety regulations by verifying whether a user is over 18 using AI-driven facial age estimation or digital identity checks, as well as the social media service Instagram and the retailer John Lewis and in Microsoft in Brazil, Singapore and Australia.

In July 2025, the United Kingdom government announced that it would begin testing artificial intelligence-based facial age estimation technology to assist in official age assessments of asylum seekers who arrive without valid documentation or whose claimed ages are disputed. The Home Office described the technology as a potentially rapid and cost-effective method to support existing age assessment procedures. Trials were scheduled to begin later in 2025, with further evaluation and assurance work planned ahead of broader integration into official processes during 2026. The proposal formed part of a wider government exploration of AI-driven tools for immigration and border management.

In March 2026, Yoti was fined €950,000 by the Spanish Data Protection Agency for three violations of the European Union's General Data Protection Regulation.
