= Protecting Kids From Social Media Act =

Social media law in Tennessee, US

Signed on May 2, 2024 by governor
- Long title: HB 1891
- Effective: January 1, 2025
- Status: In force

Protecting Kids on Social Media Act or HB 1891 is an American law that was introduced by William Lamberth of Sumner County, Tennessee and was signed into law by Tennessee's governor on May 2, 2024. The bill requires social media websites such as X, YouTube, TikTok, Facebook and others to verify the age of users and if those users are under 18, they must have parental consent.

== Progress ==
The law passed the Tennessee State Legislature with little opposition: the bill had only two no votes in the House from Aftyn Behn and Vincent B. Dixie, and it had zero no votes in the Senate.

== Bill summary ==
Every social media company must verify the age of new users after the law takes effect, and if the user had created an account before the law took effect, they must verify the age of the person attempting to access the account within 14 days. If the new user or the user who originally owned an account is under 18 years of age, they must get parental consent and the third party or social media company must not retain the data from the age verification process or obtaining parental consent. Parents who are account holders of those under 18 can view the privacy settings, set daily time restrictions, and implement breaks during which the minor cannot access the account. The law is enforced by the Attorney General of Tennessee and went into effect on January 1, 2025.

== Lawsuit ==
On October 3, 2024, the trade association NetChoice filed a lawsuit against Tennessee Attorney General Jonathan Skrmetti in the Middle District Court of Tennessee, claiming that the law violates the First Amendment. The Judge for the case is William L. Campbell Jr. An initial case management conference was originally scheduled for December 4, 2024, however it was delayed because of the Supreme Court case United States v. Skrmetti, recommending that the conference be delayed after January 20, 2025.

On February 14, 2025, Judge Eli Richardson denied NetChoice's motion for a temporary restraining order because it would disrupt the status quo of the case.
