= Facial age estimation =

Estimation of age using artificial intelligence

Facial age estimation is the use of artificial intelligence to estimate the age of a person based on their facial features. Computer vision techniques are used to analyse the facial features in the images of millions of people whose age is known and then deep learning is used to create an algorithm that tries to predict the age of an unknown person. The key use of the technology is to prevent access to age-restricted goods and services. Examples include restricting children from accessing internet pornography, checking that they meet a mandatory minimum age when registering for an account on social media, or preventing adults from accessing websites, online chat or games designed only for use by children.

The technology is distinct from facial recognition systems as the software does not attempt to uniquely identify the individual.

Researchers have applied neural networks for age estimation since at least 2010.

== Evaluation ==
An ongoing study by the National Institute of Standards and Technology (NIST) entitled 'Face Analysis Technology Evaluation' seeks to establish the technical performance of prototype age estimation algorithms submitted by academic teams and software vendors including Brno University of Technology, Czech Technical University in Prague, IDEMIA, Jumio, Nominder, Rank One Computing and Yoti.

== Public sector use ==
The UK government has explored using facial age estimation at the UK border as an alternative to bone X-rays and MRI scans when determining child status of asylum seekers.

== Commercial use ==
Commercial users of facial age estimation include Instagram and OnlyFans. In January 2025, John Lewis & Partners announced that had started using the technology to check the age of people shopping for knives on its website, to comply with UK legislation to limit knife crime.

In the UK, several supermarket chains have taken part in Home Office trials of the technology to automate the checking of a customer's age when buying age-restricted goods such as alcohol. UK legislation introduced in January 2025 mandates robust forms of age verification hosting adult content viewable in the UK by July 2025. Allowable methods include facial age estimation.

== Criticism ==
Adam Schwartz, a lawyer for the Electronic Frontier Foundation, criticized the use of facial age estimation software, noting its inaccuracy especially in cases of minorities and women, as was found in NIST's 2024 report. Twenty organisations jointly under European Digital Rights called the practice a "systematic and invasive processing of young people's data" that risks discriminatory profiling.

== See also ==
- Age verification
- Challenge 21
- Liveness test
- Online Safety Act 2023
- Online age verification in the United Kingdom
