= Robert L. Pitman =

American judge (born 1962)

Robert Pitman
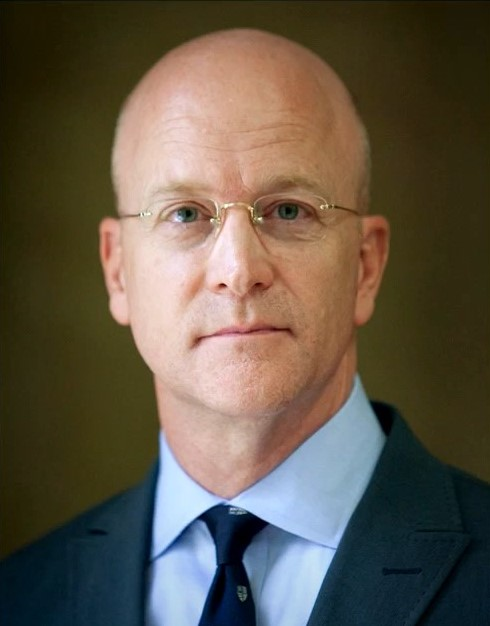

Judge of the United States District Court for the Western District of Texas
- Incumbent
- Assumed office December 19, 2014
- Appointed by: Barack Obama
- Preceded by: William Furgeson

United States Attorney for the Western District of Texas
- In office October 3, 2011 – December 19, 2014
- Appointed by: Barack Obama
- Preceded by: Johnny Sutton
- Succeeded by: Richard Durbin

Personal details
- Born: Robert Lee Pitman; 1962 (age 63–64) Fort Worth, Texas, U.S.
- Education: Abilene Christian University (BA); University of Texas, Austin (JD); University of Oxford (MSt)

Robert Lee Pitman (born 1962) is an American attorney who serves as a United States district judge of the United States District Court for the Western District of Texas. He is a former United States attorney for the Western District of Texas. He was previously a United States magistrate judge of the same court.

== Early life and education ==
Pitman was born in Fort Worth, Texas, in 1962, the youngest of five children. He received a Bachelor of Science degree from Abilene Christian University, where he was student body president. Pitman then obtained a Juris Doctor from the University of Texas School of Law. After completing law school, Pitman served as a law clerk for Judge David Owen Belew Jr. of the United States District Court for the Northern District of Texas in Fort Worth. Pitman holds a Master of Studies degree in legal research from the University of Oxford.

== Career ==
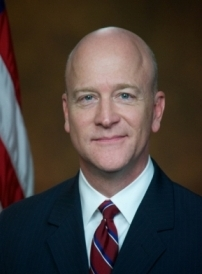
Pitman as U.S. Attorney

Following his judicial clerkship, Pitman began his career at the international law firm of Fulbright & Jaworski in Houston. In 2001, Pitman briefly served as interim United States attorney for the Western District of Texas. As United States attorney on September 11, 2001, he formed the first anti-terrorism task force in the district, uniting local, state, and federal law enforcement agencies in their counter-terrorism efforts and in their work to better secure Texas' international border. He was replaced by George W. Bush appointee Johnny Sutton, who asked Pitman to remain in the office as his chief deputy. In October 2003, Pitman was selected to serve as a United States magistrate judge for the United States District Court for the Western District of Texas. As magistrate judge, Pitman consistently ranked highest among all local, state, and federal judges in the judicial poll conducted annually by the Austin Bar Association. In 2009, Republican Senators John Cornyn and Kay Bailey Hutchison sent Pitman's name to Democratic President Barack Obama as one of two candidates for United States attorney for the Western District of Texas. The recommendation of Pitman, who is openly gay, was publicly opposed by a social conservative group in Texas. On June 27, 2011, almost two years after Pitman was recommended for the post, Obama notified members of Congress that he would nominate Pitman to be United States attorney for the Western District of Texas. He was formally nominated the following day. Citing his credentials and experience, and expressing a desire to fill the position with the most qualified candidate, he was supported by Texas' two United States Senators, both Republicans. With their support, the United States Senate confirmed Pitman to be the chief federal law enforcement officer in the Western District of Texas on September 26, 2011. He took office on October 3, 2011. He left office on December 19, 2014, upon receiving his judicial commission. He is currently an adjunct professor at the University of Texas School of Law.

=== Federal judicial service ===
On June 26, 2014, President Barack Obama nominated Pitman to serve as a United States district judge of the United States District Court for the Western District of Texas, to the seat vacated by Judge William Royal Furgeson Jr., who assumed senior status on November 30, 2008. He received a hearing before the United States Senate Committee on the Judiciary for September 9, 2014. On November 20, 2014, his nomination was reported out of committee by voice vote. On Saturday, December 13, 2014, Senate Majority Leader Harry Reid filed a motion to invoke cloture on the nomination. On December 16, 2014, Reid withdrew his cloture motion on Pitman's nomination, and the Senate proceeded to vote to confirm Pitman by a voice vote. He received his judicial commission on December 19, 2014.

=== Notable rulings ===
- On October 6, 2021, Pitman ordered Texas to suspend the Texas Heartbeat Act, a law which banned most abortions, calling it an "offensive deprivation of such an important right." Two days later the United States Court of Appeals for the Fifth Circuit reversed Pitman's suspension order, permitting the law to be enforced again.
- On December 1, 2021, Pitman struck down a Texas law which attempted to censor social media platforms, in the case, NetChoice, LLC. v. Paxton.
- On March 30, 2023, Pitman ordered the return of books containing LGBTQ content to shelves after they were removed from public libraries, saying "...the First Amendment prohibits the removal of books from libraries based on either viewpoint or content discrimination" Pittman's decision was subsequently reversed by the Fifth Circuit Court of Appeals en banc which held that there is no First Amendment right to receive information and library catalog decisions are government speech not subject to free speech challenges.
- On August 30, 2024, he enjoined a section of the SCOPE Act because they were preempted by Section 230 and violated the First Amendment in the case Computer and Communications Industry Association et al v. Paxton. The section of the SCOPE Act that was blocked required the monitoring and filtering of content that promoted suicide, self-harm, eating disorders, substance abuse, stalking, bullying, or harassment, grooming, trafficking, child pornography, or other sexual exploitation or abuse. He stated it was from clear that Texas had a compelling interest in some of the categories of content Texas was looking to filter with the law. He also stated that the laws use of the word's promotion, grooming, harassment or substance abuse were vague and that Pro-LGBTQ content could be seen as promotion of grooming, he however would let the rest of the law take effect as their wasn't enough evidence that the rest of the law violated the Constitution or was preempted by federal law.

== Personal life ==
Pitman is a sixth-generation Texan and lives in Austin. He is an avid outdoorsman and horseman. Pitman was the first openly gay United States attorney in Texas. He was one of four openly LGBT U.S. Attorneys, alongside Jenny Durkan of the Western District of Washington, Laura Duffy of the Southern District of California and Anne Tompkins of the Western District of North Carolina. Upon receiving his judicial commission, Pitman became the first openly gay judge to sit on the federal bench within the Fifth Circuit of the federal court system, which covers Texas, Louisiana, and Mississippi.

== See also ==
- List of LGBT jurists in the United States

Legal offices
Preceded by William Furgeson	Judge of the United States District Court for the Western District of Texas; 2014–present	Incumbent
