= NetChoice v. Jones =

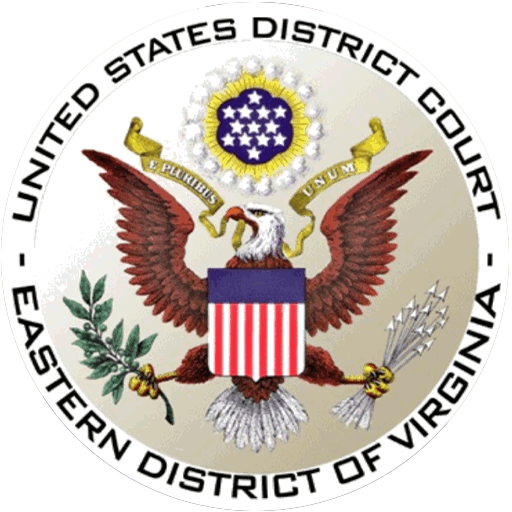
- Court: United States District Court for the Eastern District of Virginia
- Full case name: NetChoice v. Jay Jones in his official capacity as Attorney General of the Commonwealth of Virginia
- Argued: January 16, 2026
- Decided: February 27, 2026
- Docket nos.: 1:25-cv-02067 (E.D. Va) 26-1252 (4th Cir.)

Ruling
- Virginia Senate Bill 854 fails both strict scrutiny and intermediate scrutiny under the First Amendment to the United States Constitution since the law is both under and over inclusive and isn't the least restrictive means

Court membership
- Judge sitting: Patricia Tolliver Giles

NetChoice v. Jones is a legal challenge to Virginia Senate Bill 854, which requires social media companies to limit the amount of time users under the age of 16 to one hour per day without parental consent. The law would also require social media companies to verify or estimate the age of all its users. It was brought by NetChoice, an American trade association which represents many major social media companies, such as YouTube, Instagram and Facebook, against the Virginia Attorney General (Jay Jones as of 2026).

== Legal history ==
=== District Court ===
The lawsuit was filed on November 17, 2025, in the United States District Court for the Eastern District of Virginia.

A hearing was held on January 16, 2026, and on February 27, 2026, the court ruled that Virginia Senate Bill 854 violated the First Amendment of the U.S Constitution since it was content based and failed the strict scrutiny test which requires a law to have a compelling government interest, be narrowly tailored meaning it is neither overinclusive or underinclusive and be the least restrictive means.

The Court ruled that the law severed a compelling government interest but that it failed the rest of the test and that it would have failed intermediate scrutiny since it exempted video games which can also have problematic use, as is the case with social media.

=== Court of Appeals ===
On March 6, 2026, Viriginia would appeal the court's decision to the U.S Court of Appeals for the 4th Circuit and would request the court to allow the law to take effect pending appeal. A three judge panel would deny this request due to Viriginia breaking federal appellate procedure not asking the district court first. Virginia would later ask again and would be denied again by a same panel by a 2-1 vote, however, did explain why it was denied this time. A hearing for the appeal is to be held on October 28, 2026.

== See also ==
- Social media age verification laws by country
