= SCOPE Act =

State law in Texas, United States

Texas Legislature
- Long title: an act relating to the protection of minors from harmful, deceptive, or unfair trade practices in connection with the use of certain digital services and electronic devices, including the use and transfer of electronic devices to students by a public school.
- Territorial extent: State of Texas
- Enacted by: September 1, 2024
- Enacted: June 13, 2023

Legislative history
- Introduced: February 16, 2023
- First reading: May 4, 2023
- Second reading: May 23, 2023
- Third reading: May 23, 2023
- Status: Not fully in force

HB 18 also known as Securing Children Online Through Parental Empowerment Act or just The SCOPE Act is an American law in Texas. The law requires internet platforms to verify the age of a parent or guardian of accounts if they are signed in as under 18. It also requires parental consent before collecting the data on minors under 18 years of age, which is an increase from the age set at the federal level under COPPA of 13. It also requires platforms to block and filter if the content promotes suicide, self-harm, eating disorders, substance abuse, stalking, bullying, or harassment, or grooming.

== Lawsuit against the act ==
=== CCIA & NetChoice v. Paxton ===
On July 30, 2024, The trade associations The Computer and Communications Industry Association and NetChoice filed a lawsuit against Texas Attorney General Ken Paxton to the to block enforcement of the law to The Western District Court of Texas. Judge Robert Pitman on August 30, 2024, blocked the block and filtering content requirements of the law as it violated the platforms' immunity to such user content under Section 230 of federal law. However, let the rest of the law take effect as the Plaintiffs did not show evidence that the other parts of the law were unconstitutional. The Fifth Circuit upheld the injunction in July 2026 on a 2-1 split decision.

=== Students Engaged in Advancing Texas et al v. Paxton ===
On August 16, 2024, FIRE helped 4 plaintiffs to sue the Attorney General Ken Paxton, alleging that the law violated the first amendment.

== Lawsuits enforcing the act ==
=== Texas v. TikTok ===
On October 3, 2024, Ken Paxton sued TikTok for violating The SCOPE Act demanding a trial and for penalties of up to 10,000 dollars per violation. TikTok denies that it violated the law.

=== Paxton v. Discord ===
Paxton sued Discord in May 2026 over its failure to prevent exposure of minors to sexual exploitation and extremist content, required by the unchallenged parts of the SCOPE Act. In July 2026, the judge issued an order that Discord had 90 days to implement the same protections for minors it had set up in the UK for Texas users.
