= Walker Montgomery Protecting Children Online Act =

2024 Mississippi law

The Walker Montgomery Protecting Children Online Act

Mississippi Legislature
- Long title: AN ACT TO CREATE THE "WALKER MONTGOMERY PROTECTING CHILDREN ONLINE ACT" FOR THE PURPOSE OF PROTECTING MINOR CHILDREN FROM ONLINE HARMFUL MATERIAL AND ACCESS TO SUCH MATERIAL; TO REQUIRE DIGITAL SERVICE USERS TO REGISTER THEIR AGE; TO LIMIT THE COLLECTION AND USE OF MINOR USERS' PERSONAL IDENTIFYING INFORMATION; TO REQUIRE DIGITAL SERVICES PROVIDERS TO DEVELOP AND IMPLEMENT A STRATEGY TO PREVENT OR MITIGATE CERTAIN HARMS TO MINORS; TO AMEND SECTION 75-24-5, MISSISSIPPI CODE OF 1972, TO PROVIDE THAT A VIOLATION OF THIS ACT IS AN UNFAIR AND DECEPTIVE TRADE PRACTICE THAT IS ENFORCEABLE BY THE OFFICE OF THE ATTORNEY GENERAL; TO AMEND SECTION 97-5-31, MISSISSIPPI CODE OF 1972, TO INCLUDE MORPHED IMAGES OF DEPICTING MINOR CHILDREN IN EXPLICIT NATURE IN THE CRIME OF CHILD EXPLOITATION; AND FOR RELATED PURPOSES.
- Citation: § 45-38-1 to 45-38-13
- Territorial extent: State of Mississippi
- Signed: signed on April 30, 2024 by Governor Tate Reeves
- Effective: April 17, 2025, due to court decision (originally July 1, 2024)

Legislative history
- Introduced: February 14, 2024
- Passed: March 12, 2024
- Voting summary: 121 Mississippi Representatives voted for; 0 Mississippi Representatives voted against
- Passed: April 8, 2024
- Voting summary: 49 Mississippi Senators voted for; 0 Mississippi Senators voted against
- Status: In force

The Walker Montgomery Protecting Children Online Act or HB 1126 is an American law in the state of Mississippi. The bill had passed with no votes against it in both the Senate and House in the state.

== Bill Summary ==
The law applies to digital services that allows users to make content on public or semi-public profiles which can be signed into and allows sharing that content on a message board, chat room or landing page, video channel or main feed.

However, it doesn't apply to news sources, online games or the content that is be made is by the service itself or is an application website. These services must also verify the age of users by a "commercially reasonable effort" and if the user is under 18 years of age, they must get the consent from a parent or guardian.

Digital services must also limit collection of the known minor's personal identifying information to information reasonably necessary and limit the use of the known minor's personal identifying information as well as limit targeted advertising of harmful material to minors.

It also requires digital services to moderate content that promotes or facilitates self-harm, eating disorders, substance use disorders, suicidal behaviors, patterns of use that indicate or encourage substance abuse or use of illegal drugs, stalking, physical violence, online bullying, harassment, grooming, trafficking, child pornography, other sexual exploitation or abuse, incitement of violence, or any other illegal activity.

== Lawsuit ==
=== NetChoice v. Fitch ===
==== Southern District Court of Mississippi ====
On June 7, 2024, The trade associations NetChoice filed a lawsuit against Attorney General Lynn Fitch to The Southern District Court of Mississippi. The Electronic Frontier Foundation would file a brief for the case on June 18, 2024. The law would later be enjoined on July 1, 2024, by Judge Halil Suleyman Ozerden for likely violating the first amendment but didn't doubt the good intentions of the law.

==== Fifth Circuit Court of Appeals ====
The case was later appealed to The Fifth Circuit Court of Appeals on July 5, 2024, and in October 2024 The American Civil Liberties Union, Electronic Frontier Foundation, TechFreedom,Foundation for Individual Rights and Expression,Chamber of Progress, LGBT Tech and Woodhull Freedom Foundation would file briefs for the case.

The Fifth Circuit heard oral arguments for the case on February 4, 2025.

On April 17, 2025, the Fifth Circuit Court of Appeals allowed the law to go into effect by vacating the injunction, citing Moody v. NetChoice, LLC to argue the district court did not apply the right standard of review for the case.

== Impact ==
On August 22, 2025, social media service Bluesky geoblocked access in Mississippi in response to the act, saying they could not justify the expenses in building the infrastructure required to comply. The company published a blog post criticizing the law for imposing prohibitive financial barriers on web developers who could not afford to comply, as well as its potential implications for privacy and free speech online. Although the service had already complied with the Online Safety Act 2023 in the United Kingdom, Bluesky stated that the Mississippi law required age verification of everyone using the service, as well as record keeping of the ages of users, while by contrast, the UK's Online Safety Act only required one-time age checks for any user accessing potentially sensitive or adult content. Bluesky stated the geoblock would remain in place until legal challenges to the law were resolved.
