= Age verification =

Measure used to restrict access by age

Age verification, also known as age gating, age assurance or age checking is the use of any technical system that externally verifies a person's age. These systems are used primarily to restrict access to content classified, either voluntarily or by local laws, as being inappropriate for users under a specific age, such as alcohol, tobacco, gambling, video games with objectionable content, pornography, or to remain in compliance with internet privacy laws that regulate the collection of personal information from minors, such as COPPA in the United States.

Following the publication of The Anxious Generation, which proposes that governments globally should take action against minors using the internet, as well as the passing of the Online Safety Act 2023 in the UK, laws that mandate age verification via the utilization of AI facial scans and government IDs significantly increased around the globe since late 2024 when Australia announced a ban on social media for those under 16, as well as subsequent introductions of similar laws in France, eight U.S. states including Texas, California, Utah, and proposals at the national level in the U.S., Canada, Denmark, the EU, and many other countries across the globe. Age verification for inappropriate content on social networking services apply for those in the UK, Australia, Brazil and some U.S. states. Some online platforms such as Roblox and Discord also mandated digital age checks for their users worldwide. Age verification via government ID for those over 16 to access social media apply in the countries of Australia Indonesia, Malaysia and across all of the internet in Brazil as of June 2026.

Age verification can be categorized into parental responsibility and online service provider responsibility.

Online age verification is considered controversial and criticized by privacy rights organizations, with its push in recent years causing a moral panic. Age-based online segregation requires technical and legal frameworks which enable governments to segregate and censor groups. Extending the verification frameworks beyond age or towards mandatory digital identity enables online political repression and techno-authoritarianism. Age verification through online providers was associated with a general public distrust of the government.

== Methods ==
=== Honor system ===
Example of an honor-based age verification dialog box displayed upon entering a website

The most basic form of age verification is to require a person to input their date of birth on a form or to click a button to declare they are above a certain age. However, this depends on an honor system that assumes the honesty of the end user. The person may, for instance, be a minor who fraudulently inserts a valid date that meets the age criteria, rather than their own. For this reason the system has been described as ineffective.

=== Parental controls ===
Parental controls enable parents to apply internet filters to restrict their children's access to content they deem inappropriate for their age. Contemporary parental controls have been criticized for being too restrictive or too permissive, difficulty of use and ease of bypassing.

=== Credit card verification ===
Some age verification systems require people to provide credit card information; this method depends on an assumption that the vast majority of credit card holders are adults, because U.S. credit card companies did not originally issue cards to minors. Additionally, a minor may still attempt to obtain their parent's credit card information, or persuade or defraud users into divulging their credit card number to an individual to use for their own purposes, defeating the stated purpose of the system.

In 2005, Salvatore LoCascio pleaded guilty to charges of credit card fraud; one of his schemes had involved using credit card-based age verification systems to charge users for "free" tours of adult entertainment websites.

=== Federated identification ===
Aylo, a major operator of porn websites, operates an age verification provider known as AgeID. First introduced in Germany in 2015, it uses third-party providers to authenticate the user's age, and a single sign-on model that allows the verified identity to be shared across any participating website.

=== Facial age estimation ===
Facial age estimation uses machine learning to estimate the user's age by analysing their facial features in a selfie. This is combined with a liveness test in order to ensure that the image is that of a real person and not a static or simulated image.

In 2026, online game platform Roblox introduced facial age estimation using systems developed by Persona in the wake of controversies surrounding child safety and what it describes as "digital vigilantism". The system works by separating users into "age groups" which determine whether someone can use social features on the platform. However, it has been criticized for potentially making it easier for predators to pass as children, as accounts belonging to a specific age group are often sold on websites such as eBay. Some have noticed that items such as Bratz dolls, a potato, and a photo of deceased Nirvana member Kurt Cobain are sometimes identified by the system as adults. Roblox's implementation of the technology has since spiked the growth of facial age estimation leading other big platforms in its footsteps.

=== Behavioral analysis ===
Some age estimation systems are based on the use of machine learning to estimate the user's age based on AI analysis of their behavior and usage of a service (such as content accessed). These systems can catch false positives despite the complexity of this artificial intelligence, such as falsely declaring an adult to be a minor.

The adult video game franchise Leisure Suit Larry used a more primitive form of behavioral analysis intended to be comedic in nature, presenting players with trivia questions that, in the opinion of franchise creator Al Lowe, a child would not be likely to know the answer to (e.g. "All politicians are: a. hard-working, b. honest, c. on the public payroll") in order to launch the game, although this could be bypassed with a keyboard shortcut.

=== Zero-knowledge proof ===
Zero-knowledge proofs can be used to verify a person's age without the person disclosing their identity, either to the receiver, such as a business, or the verifying entity, like a government that issues a passport.

Many such implementations of age verification have been criticised for the use of mobile apps which require device attestation to function, effectively making them unavailable to those who can't or don't want to use the major mobile phone platforms Android or iOS. Such systems also often require app installation – either through the app stores operated by Google or Apple or using some third-party installation method, and they depend on the mobile device's owner having trust in the verification app and the installation system.

== Data breaches ==
Age verification systems have been criticized for privacy and computer security risks. Age verification system data breaches have included AU10TIX (2024), Discord/Zendesk (2025), Persona (2026), and IDScan (2026).

== By country ==
=== Australia ===
Australia intended to implement requirements for age verification under the Online Safety Act 2021. In August 2023, Minister for Communications Michelle Rowland released a report by eSafety that recommended against such a scheme, finding that "at present, each type of age verification or age assurance technology comes with its own privacy, security, effectiveness or implementation issue", and suggesting that an industry code be adopted to promote the use of content filtering software to parents.

In May 2024, the federal government allocated AU$6.5 million from the 2024 Australian federal budget to a pilot age verification scheme meant to protect children from accessing pornography and other harmful digital content in response to a sharp rise in domestic violence nationally.

On 10 September 2024, Prime Minister Anthony Albanese and Minister for Communications Michelle Rowland confirmed that the federal government would introduce legislation to enforce a minimum age for access to social media and other relevant digital platforms. The federal government would also work with states and territorial governments to develop a uniform framework. Albanese said that the legislation was intended to safeguard the safety and mental and physical health of young people while Rowland said that the proposed legislation would hold big tech to account for harmful online environments and social media addiction among children. The minimum age is likely to be set between 14 and 16 years of age. The federal government's announcement followed South Australia's plan to restrict social media access to people aged 14 and above, and the Coalition's promise to restrict social media access to people aged 16 if it won the 2025 Australian federal election.

The federal government's moves to impose a social media age limit was supported by New South Wales Premier Chris Minns, South Australian Premier Peter Malinauskas, Victorian Premier Jacinta Allan and Queensland Premier Steven Miles. The Coalition's communications spokesman David Coleman said social media age verification should be limited to those aged 16 and above. In response, the Australian Association of Psychologists director Carly Dober described the Government's proposed social media age limit as a "bandaid response to a very complicated and deeply entrenched issue". She also said that the ban ignored the benefits that online spaces could offer to young people, especially those from marginalised communities. Similar criticism was echoed by Daniel Angus, director of the Queensland University of Technology Digital Media Research Centre, and the Australian Internet regulator, the eSafety Commissioner, who expressed concern that a social media ban would exclude young people from "meaningful" digital engagement and access to critical support.

On 7 November, Prime Minister Albanese confirmed that the government would introduce legislation in November to ban young people under the age of 16 from using social media. The proposed legislation would not include exemptions for young people who already have social media accounts or those with parental consent. The children's advocacy group Australian Child Rights Taskforce criticised the proposed law as a "blunt instrument" and urged the Albanese government to instead impose safety standards on social media platforms. By contrast, the 36Months initiative has supported the social media age limit on the grounds that excessive social media usage was "rewiring young brains" and causing an "epidemic of mental illness".

On 21 November, the Albanese government introduced the Online Safety Amendment, legislation that would ban young people under the age of 16 from accessing social media and proposed fines of up to A$49.5 million (US$32 million) on social media platforms for systemic breaches. The proposed law would affect Facebook, Instagram, TikTok, X and Snapchat. However, Albanese confirmed that children would still have access to messaging, online gaming, and health and education-related services including the youth mental health platform Headspace, Google Classroom and YouTube. The opposition Liberals intend to support the legislation while the Australian Greens have sought more details on the proposed law.

=== Canada ===
The proposed Protecting Young Persons from Exposure to Pornography Act would prohibit organizations from making "sexually explicit" material available on the internet for commercial purposes to users under the age of 18, unless an age verification or estimation system is implemented, or the content has a legitimate artistic, educational, or scientific purpose. The bill excludes platforms (such as search engines) that are "incidentally and not deliberately" designed to provide access to sexually explicit material.

It was originally introduced in the 44th Canadian Parliament in 2021, and was criticized for privacy implications, not specifically specifying a required form of age verification, and freedom of expression concerns surrounding its scope—which can include social networking and online video services, and allow for blocking of entire websites to users in Canada if they do not comply with orders issued under the bill—even if the rest of the content is otherwise non-pornographic. The bill passed the Senate in 2023 and began committee review in the House of Commons in late-May 2024, but was not passed before the prorogation of Parliament in January 2025. It was subsequently reintroduced with amendments in May 2025 after the formation of the 45th Canadian Parliament.

=== China ===
On August 30, 2021, the State Press and Publication Administration issued the Notice of the State Press and Publication Administration on Further Strict Management to Effectively Prevent Minors from Being Addicted to Online Games, which stipulates that all online game enterprises may only provide online game services to minors for one hour from 20:00 to 21:00 daily on Fridays, Saturdays, Sundays and legal holidays, and may not provide online game services to minors in any form at other times.

=== Germany ===
In Germany age verification systems are mandated by the "Jugendmedienschutz-Staatsvertrag" which was introduced in September 2002. The institution in charge Commission for the Protection of Minors in the Media (KJM) considers only systems equivalent to face-to-face verification as sufficient for age verification.

=== Iran ===
Everyone aged 15 and above gets ID'd with use of National card. Citizens are authenticated in to access each of the digital government IranPass ecosystems including purchasing with bank card at specific stores.

=== United Kingdom ===
With the passing of the Digital Economy Act 2017, the United Kingdom passed a law containing a legal mandate on the provision of age verification. Under the act, websites that publish pornography on a commercial basis would have been required to implement a "robust" age verification system. The British Board of Film Classification (BBFC) was charged with enforcing this legislation. After a series of setbacks and public backlash, the planned scheme was eventually abandoned in 2019.

While the UK government abandoned this legislation, age verification continues to be monitored and enforced by regulatory bodies including Ofcom and the ICO. Other standards are emerging for age assurance systems, such as PAS1296:2018. The ISO standard for age assurance systems (PWI 7732) is also being developed by the Age Check Certificate Scheme, the Age Verification Providers’ Association, and other Conformity Assessment Bodies.

In 2023, Parliament passed the Online Safety Act 2023; as part of the mandatory duty of care to protect children, all service providers must use age verification or estimation to prevent children from accessing "primary priority content that is harmful to children", which includes pornographic images. The provisions took effect on 25 July 2025, and apply to all services that host such content, including social networks.

A 2025 YouGov opinion poll found among adults in the United Kingdom 39% strongly support, 35% somewhat support and 19% oppose banning social media under the age of 16.

=== United States ===
Some websites of alcoholic beverage companies attempt to verify the age of visitors so that they can confirm they are at least the American legal drinking age of 21.

In 2000, the Children's Online Privacy Protection Act (COPPA) took effect at the federal level, resulting in some websites adding age verification for visitors under the age of 13, and some websites disallowing accounts for users under the age of 13. Companies such as YouTube and ByteDance have received large fines from the Federal Trade Commission (FTC) for not complying with COPPA.

In 2022, Louisiana became the first state to require age verification for accessing adult websites. Usage of LA Wallet, the state's digital ID and mobile drivers license app, subsequently spiked, as LA Wallet allows for remote identification via MindGeek, the owner of many major porn sites.

In 2023, several states, including Arkansas and Utah, passed social media addiction bills requiring users of social media platforms to be over the age of 18 or have parental consent, with these bills prescribing that age verification be used to enforce this requirement. One such bill is the Utah Social Media Regulation Act, which is scheduled to take effect in 2024, and attempts to prevent minors from using social media from 10:30 PM to 6:30 AM.

In May 2023, a law passed in Utah requiring that pornography websites verify the ages of their visitors, although it has a clause that bars it from taking effect until five other states also implement similar measures. A few days before the law passed, in order to protest the bill, Pornhub blocked their website from being viewed in Utah. The trade group Free Speech Coalition filed a lawsuit against the state of Utah, claiming the law violated the First Amendment. The lawsuit was dismissed by U.S. District Court Judge Ted Stewart on August 1, 2023; however, the Free Speech Coalition stated they would appeal this ruling.

In contrast, on August 31, 2023, U.S. District Judge David Ezra invalidated a Texas law passed in June mandating age verification and health warnings before accessing pornographic websites following a lawsuit from the Free Speech Coalition, and barred the state attorney general's office from enforcing the law on the grounds that it violates the right to free speech and is overly broad and vague. The Texas Attorney General's office stated they would appeal the ruling. The 5th Circuit Court of Appeals overturned the injunction pending a full hearing. The case eventually progressed to the Supreme Court, who ruled 6–3 in favor of the age verification law, holding that it "only incidentally burdens the protected speech of adults".

A new variant of these laws began to surface in late-2025, which requires all operating system vendors to include functionality for securely storing a user's date of birth in their account, and include an age attestation API producing a "digital signal" communicating the user's age or age range to applications which request it. They also require all application vendors to request the age signal whenever software is downloaded or launched on the device. While these bills do not explicitly require that the user's age be verified or that content be filtered, the age signals themselves are legally considered to be actual knowledge of the user's age, thus making vendors liable under other state and federal laws. The first of these bills, the Digital Age Assurance Act, was signed into law by California in October 2025. The bill faced criticism for its wide reach, including free and open-source software platforms who may not have the necessary infrastructure to implement the requirements, and operating systems not always used for general computing (such as embedded systems and servers).

== Trade association ==
The Age Verification Providers Association is a trade association of companies in the sector. It was founded in 2018 and had 27 member companies as of 2023.

== See also ==
- Identity verification service
- Real-name system
- Social Credit System
- Online age verification laws by country
- Internet censorship
- Computer and network surveillance
- List of moral panics
