= Virginia Senate Bill 854 =

Senate Bill 854

Virginia General Assembly
- Long title: Consumer Data Protection Act; social media platforms, responsibilities and prohibitions to minors.
- Territorial extent: Virginia
- Enacted by: Virginia Senate
- Enacted by: Virginia House of Representatives
- Effective: January 1, 2026

Legislative history

Initiating chamber: Virginia Senate
- Introduced: January 3, 2025
- First reading: January 31, 2025
- Second reading: February 3, 2025
- Third reading: February 3, 2025
- Voting summary: Unanimously voted for; None voted against

Revising chamber: Virginia House of Representatives
- Received from the Virginia Senate: February 6, 2025
- First reading: February 6, 2025
- Second reading: February 19, 2025
- Third reading: February 20, 2025
- Voting summary: 97 voted for; None voted against; 3 present not voting
- Status: Pending

Virginia Senate Bill 854 also known SB 854 is a law that passed in May 2025 that would restrict social media platforms for users under 16 to just one hour per day, per platform unless they had parental consent. The law would also require social media companies to verify the age of all users. The law is enforced by the Virginia Attorney General since the law is an amendment to the Virginia Consumer Data Protection Act.

The law was originally a bill to regulate addictive social media feeds for users under 18 but was amended after a similar bill was rejected by a subcommittee in the Virginia House of Representatives by a vote of 6–4.

== Legal Challenges ==
On November 17, 2025, the trade association NetChoice sued the current Attorney General of Virginia Jason S. Miyares to prevent enforcement of the law which takes effect in January 2026.

== See Also ==
- NetChoice v. Jones
