= Liveness test =

Automated means of checking whether a subject is a real person

A liveness test, liveness check or liveness detection is an automated method for determining whether a subject is a real person or part of a spoofing attack. The technique is used as part of know your customer checks in financial services and during facial age estimation.

Liveness detection is a cornerstone of digital safety.

== Test process ==
The threat in face spoofing attacks is that "the attacker only needs to find a good face swap library on Github and understand how to inject the model into the camera feed during the KYC process". Fraudsters usually buy stolen IDs on the dark web to start a deepfake attack. An AI-powered generative adversarial network (GAN) can then generate the face swapping model that many online verification services fail to detect. Low level hackers may use face swapping apps such as SwapFace, DeepFaceLive, and Swapstream (increasing interest for those apps in 2023 according to Google Trends).

In a video liveness test, users are typically asked to look into a camera and to move, smile or blink, and features of their moving face may then be compared to that of a still image. Artificial intelligence is used to counter presentation attacks such as deepfakes or users wearing hyperrealistic masks, or video injection attacks.

Other forms of liveness test include checking for a pulse when using a fingerprint scanner or checking that a person's voice is not a recording or artificially generated during speaker recognition.

== Adoption and certification ==
In a 2022 report published by the security firm Sensity, it was demonstrated that the liveness test of most US banks was easily cheated with new and publicly-available AI-powered techniques. Many of these banks disregarded the results of the report. In the first half of 2023, the security firm iProov detected a 704% increase in face-swap attacks. In 2023, in the UK, many customers of Ryanair were upset to have to go through many ID verification checks, including liveness tests, before boarding, as the airline was using it as a mean to deter customers to buy tickets through third-party websites.

In the first half of 2024 iBeta Quality Assurance issued 18 new ISO/IEC 30107-3 Presentation Attack Detection certificates, raising the cumulative total to 85 since 2018.

In January 2024, the Department of Homeland Security (DHS) opened applications from vendors to test their Liveness test. Identity frauds peaked during the COVID-19 lockdown, leading government agencies to take reinforced measures to secure their digital applications.

== See also ==
- Artificial intelligence content detection
- Biometric spoofing
- Electronic authentication
- Identity verification service
- Multi-factor authentication
- Voice spoofing
