= California Digital Age Assurance Act =

2025 California law requiring OS-level age signals for app developers

California State Legislature
- Full name: Digital Age Assurance Act
- Acronym: DAAA
- Assembly voted: June 2, 2025 (Unanimous)
- Senate voted: September 13, 2025 (Unanimous)
- Signed into law: October 13, 2025
- Sponsor(s): Buffy Wicks
- Governor: Gavin Newsom
- Code: Civil Code
- Section: CA Civil Code Code §1798.500 et seq.
- Associated bills: Assembly Bill 1856 (AB 1856)

Status: Not yet in force

The Digital Age Assurance Act (DAAA), formally Assembly Bill 1043, is a California law that requires operating system providers to collect age information from users at device account setup and to transmit an age-bracket signal to application developers.

== Legislative history ==
The bill's stated objective is to address a gap in California's existing legal framework for protecting minors online. Prior California laws attempted to impose obligations on platforms likely to be accessed by children, but they have been enjoined by federal courts on First Amendment grounds. AB 1043 was designed to sidestep constitutional objections by imposing no direct content restrictions, instead creating an age-signaling infrastructure that other laws could act upon.

AB 1043 was introduced by Assemblymember Buffy Wicks, who had previously authored the California Age-Appropriate Design Code Act. The bill passed the California State Assembly 76-0 in June 2025 and the California State Senate 38-0 in September 2025. It was signed into law by Governor Newsom on October 13, 2025, and filed the same day with the California Secretary of State. Governor Newsom issued a signing statement noting concerns from streaming services and video game developers about the law, specifically "complexities such as multi-user accounts shared by a family member and user profiles utilized across multiple devices." Newsom urged the Legislature to amend the law to address these concerns before its effective date. Wicks subsequently indicated willingness to work with streaming providers on possible remedies.

== Provisions ==
The Act establishes four age brackets for purposes of the required signal: under 13 years of age, 13 to under 16, 16 to under 18, and 18 or older. Under the law, "operating system providers" (excluding distributors of open-source operating systems) must display an interface at account setup that requires the birth date, age, or both, of the device's primary user and provide a digital signal specifying the associated age bracket via a "reasonably consistent real-time application programming interface." Developers must request an age bracket signal when an application covered by the law is downloaded and launched. Upon receiving a signal, a developer is "deemed to have actual knowledge" of the user's age range, triggering potential obligations under other laws such as the Children's Online Privacy Protection Act and the California Consumer Privacy Act.

Violations are subject to civil penalties of up to $2,500 per affected child for each negligent violation and up to $7,500 per affected child for each intentional violation.

== Reception ==
The Reason Foundation said that the bill "represents a meaningful advancement in the national debate on age verification. It replaces high-risk identity checks with privacy-preserving signals, curtails constitutional litigation risks, and clarifies enforcement responsibility," but added that the law should be amended so the protections were opt-in.

The Electronic Frontier Foundation (EFF) characterized OS-level age gates as creating "unnecessary and unconstitutional barriers for adults and young people to access information and express themselves online." EFF argued that because developers receiving an age signal are "deemed to have actual knowledge" of a minor user's age, they face legal incentives to restrict access to applications beyond what the law requires, amounting to outsourced censorship. They noted that the law's burdens fall disproportionately on developers who are not part of large, well-resourced companies, particularly free and open-source software developers, for whom building age-collection and signaling functionality may not be feasible.

More than 400 computer scientists signed an open letter protesting such laws, stating that they will create surveillance infrastructure without effectively preventing minors' access to age-restricted content. Several open-source projects announced that they would not implement the law's requirements, including GrapheneOS, MidnightBSD, DB48X, and Ageless Linux, which was launched as an act of civil disobedience against AB 1043, declaring itself to be in "full, knowing, and intentional noncompliance" with the law.

In May 2026, Wicks introduced a bill amending the Act in order to reduce its burden on the distributors of open-source operating systems, which was passed in July 2026. The amendment redefines an "operating system provider" to exclude "a person or entity that distributes an operating system or application under license terms that permit a recipient to copy, redistribute, and modify the software", and "application" to exclude "software components that are not themselves offered to consumers as a stand-alone executable application through a covered application store".
