= Parental Rights in Social Media Act =

2025 Nebraska law

LB 383

Nebraska Legislature
- Long title: Parental Rights in Social Media Act
- Citation: §86-1701 to §86-1705
- Territorial extent: State of Nebraska
- Passed: May 14, 2025
- Signed by: Jim Pillen
- Signed: May 20, 2025
- Effective: July 1, 2026
- Introduced by: Tanya Storer at the request of the governor
- Introduced: January 17, 2025
- Voting summary: 46 voted for; 3 voted against; None abstained

Summary
- Requires anyone under 18 to have parental consent before making a social media account and requires social media platforms to have age verification.
- Status: In force

The Parental Rights in Social Media Act, also known as LB 383, is a Nebraska law signed into law in May 2025 by Nebraska Governor Jim Pillen. The law was introduced by Tanya Storer on behalf of the governor, who had earlier stated an intent to find ways to regulate social media for minors within the state.

== Requirements ==
The law requires any website meeting its definition of a social media company to verify users' ages using a third party vendor and prevents minors from using those sites without consent from a parent or guardian, whic can be revoked. The law also imposes restrictions on the retention of the age verification data. A parent or guardian is required to have the ability to view a minor's posts and messages as well as control the minor's privacy settings and limit their time spent on the platform.

The law is enforceable by a private right of action and by the Nebraska Attorney General, who can collect fines up to 2,500 dollars per violation. The law took effect on July 1, 2026.
