= The Babylon Bee =

Satirical news website

- Website type: Satirical publication
- Available in: English
- Founded: March 1, 2016
- Headquarters: Jupiter, Florida, U.S.
- Founder: Adam Ford
- Key people: Owner & CEO: Seth Dillon; Owner & CTO: Dan Dillon; Editor-in-chief: Kyle Mann
- Website: babylonbee.com
- Current status: Active

The Babylon Bee is an American conservative Christian news satire website that publishes satirical articles on topics including religion, politics, current events, and public figures.

== History ==
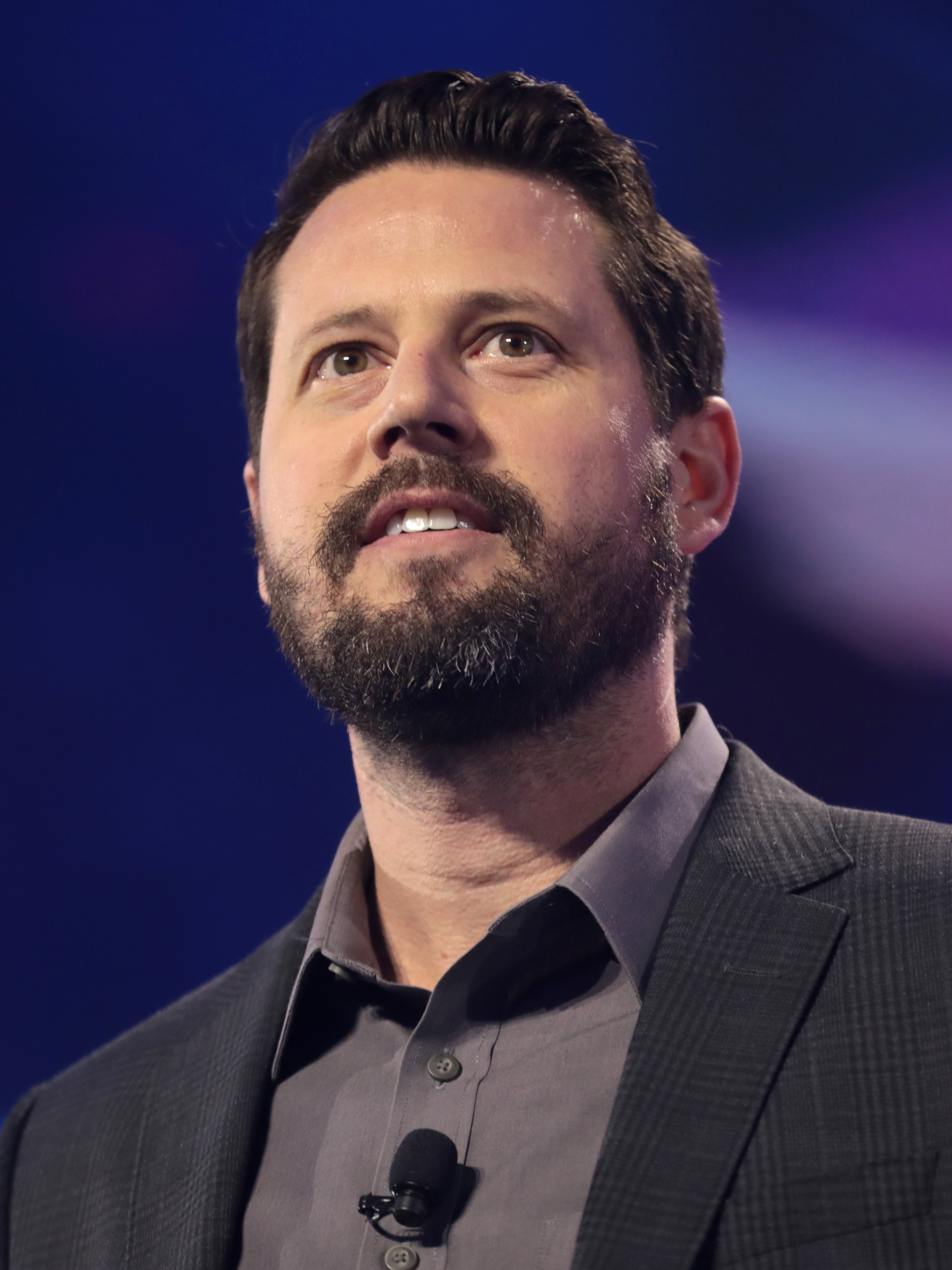
Seth Dillon, owner and CEO of The Babylon Bee

The Babylon Bee was founded by Adam Ford and was launched on March 1, 2016. It is headquartered in Jupiter, Florida, and employs around 24 people across the United States.

In 2017, Hurricane Harvey battered Houston, Texas, causing widespread flooding. In that context, The Babylon Bee satirically criticized televangelist Joel Osteen with a headline that read: "Joel Osteen Sails Luxury Yacht Through Flooded Houston to Pass Out Copies Of Your Best Life Now". The article went viral, prompting a fact check from Snopes.

In late 2018, Ford sold the website to Seth Dillon. In an interview with The Christian Post, Ford cited several reasons for the sale, including his discomfort with the power wielded by social media companies like Facebook over creators and what he perceived as an anti-conservative and anti-Christian bias.

At the time of the website's sale, Kyle Mann, who had been head writer since September 2016, became editor-in-chief. Ford maintained a financial stake in the site and its sister site Not the Bee until November 2023. Citing the "inevitable consequences of burnout" that came from keeping up with current events, he handed over full control to brothers Seth and Dan Dillon. Seth remained the majority owner of The Babylon Bee while Dan Dillon, who had helped cofound Not the Bee, became its majority owner.

At the time of its sale to Dillon, The Babylon Bee was receiving 3 million page views per month. In October 2020, the website said that it was receiving about 8 million visitors a month. which would have been more than The Onion's traffic in the same period. By January 2021, The Washington Times said that The Babylon Bee was receiving more than 20 million page views per month, had more than 20,000 paid subscribers, and had a Twitter account with more than 856,000 followers. In January 2022, The Economist said that The Babylon Bee was "claiming as many as 25 m[illion] readers a month at its peak", and that Dillon had turned The Babylon Bee "into one of the most popular conservative sites after Fox News".

== Content ==
The Babylon Bee began by lampooning a wide range of topics including progressives, Democrats, Republicans, Christians, and Donald Trump. The purpose of the site, according to its founder Adam Ford in 2016, was not just to evoke laughter, but to prompt self-reflection. "It's important to look at what we're doing, to 'examine ourselves.' Satire acts like an overhead projector, taking something that people usually ignore and projecting it up on the wall for everyone to see. It forces us to look at things we wouldn't normally look at and makes us ask if we're okay with them." In an April 2016 Washington Post profile of the site and its founder, Bob Smietana observed that "The Bee excels at poking fun at the small idiosyncrasies of believers, especially evangelical Protestants." Susan E. Isaacs publishing in Christianity Today wrote in May 2018 that the site "lampoon[ed] the faithful across denominations, political affiliations, and age groups". Emma Green in The Atlantic noted of The Babylon Bee's content in October 2021, "Although political humor drives much of The Bee's web traffic, the publication's signature hits focus on what the writers see as shallowness in the evangelical world."

In the years leading up to 2020, the site grew less critical of Trump and more critical of the left and liberalism, though it continued to satirize topics across both parties. Emma Goldberg of The New York Times said in 2020 that although Trump was still not off limits as a target for The Babylon Bee, "their "early coverage of Trump, back in 2016, was much more vitriolic than today's. They called him a psychopath, or a megalomaniac. Now they're more bemused by him and the ghoulish ways he's described on the left." In another 2020 New York Times article, Emma Goldberg wrote that the unifying goal of the site was "poking fun at the left", and that "their most popular articles are often those making jokes at the expense of Democratic presidential candidate Joe Biden". She wrote that its success was due to finding ways to punch up by "ridiculing every source of authority outside the White House." In the same article, The Babylon Bee's editor-in-chief Kyle Mann summarized how he believed readers of The Babylon Bee considered the site: "this comedy makes fun of everybody, but it's a little harder on the left, and when it makes fun of the right it's not hateful." Parker J. Bach wrote in Slate in June 2021 that the site frequently makes jokes that target marginalized groups, with articles that are "often 'ironically' misogynistic" and "frequently antagonistic toward the LGBTQIA+ community". In an October 2021 interview with The Atlantic, Mann described the site's view of satire and its mission as "mock[ing] people who hold cultural power and ... communicat[ing] truth to a culture that many times does not believe in an objective, universal truth any longer."

The Babylon Bee's hosted Elon Musk for an interview on the site's podcast in December 2021. The episode featured regular hosts Kyle Mann and Ethan Nicolle, who were joined by Seth Dillon. The podcast covered a wide range of topics, ranging from a response to Senator Elizabeth Warren's criticism of how little Musk paid in taxes to scandals at CNN to his thoughts on Christianity.

Jennifer Graham of Deseret News attributed the success of The Babylon Bee in 2021 to "the increasing polarization in America, with Republicans and Democrats clustering in information silos that reflect and affirm their beliefs." Nick Gillespie of Reason praised The Babylon Bee in 2022, saying that "The fact that the Bee is very funny, day in and day out, is almost enough to get me, a lapsed Catholic, to believe in divine intervention, if not a covenant of grace not works." The New Yorker and The New York Times have described The Babylon Bee as a Christian or conservative version of The Onion.

== Mistaken for factual reporting ==
As the readership of The Babylon Bee increased from 2016 to 2020, there were independent, ongoing discussions within journalistic circles on how to handle the rise of fake news and its influence on the public. The Babylon Bee was brought into this wider conversation when several of their articles were shared on social media or reported upon, ostensibly as factual.

In 2019, The Babylon Bee satirically criticized Donald Trump with an article saying that Trump claimed he had "done more for Christianity than Jesus". The article went viral, prompting a fact check from Snopes after some thought the article was a real story.

The Conversation published research by academics at the Ohio State University in August 2019 that found that people regularly mistook satirical reports from The Babylon Bee, The Colbert Report, The Onion, and others for genuine news. They found that "stories published by the Bee were among the most shared factually inaccurate content in almost every survey we conducted." They also found that both Republicans and Democrats mistook articles from The Babylon Bee as news, but Republicans were considerably more likely to do so. The Babylon Bee's editor-in-chief, Kyle Mann, criticized the research in a conversation with Reason TV, describing it as "methodologically flawed" and saying The Conversation reworded the headlines and took them out of context when asking survey respondents if they thought they were real. Reason's John Osterhoudt said that the headlines had been "stripped of both context and comedy", giving as an example The Babylon Bee headline "CNN: 'God Allowed the Mueller Report to Test Our Shakeable Faith in Collusion'" that was rephrased to participants as "CNN news anchor Anderson Cooper said his belief that Trump colluded with Russia is unshakable; it will not change regardless of statements or evidence to the contrary."

Media outlets' responses to incidents in which The Babylon Bee's content was mistaken for factual reporting have varied. Some have described The Babylon Bee and its content as obviously satirical, whereas others have suggested the site misleads its readers, either intentionally or inadvertently. The frequency with which Babylon Bee stories are confused with real news has resulted in numerous reactions from fact-checkers.

In September 2020, British newspaper The Guardian reprinted as factual a Bee-doctored image of LeBron James wearing a lace collar supposedly in tribute to Ruth Bader Ginsburg.

In October 2020, a satirical news story by The Babylon Bee claiming that Twitter had been shut down to protect Joe Biden from negative coverage was retweeted by then-U.S. President Donald Trump, who, according to some journalists, seemed to not realize the article was parody and condemned the fabricated incident described in the story as a case of leftist censorship. This event prompted Kevin Roose, writing in The New York Times, to question whether The Babylon Bee "traffic[s] in misinformation under the guise of comedy", concluding that "The Babylon Bee is not a covert disinformation operation disguised as a right-wing satire site, and is in fact trying to do comedy, but may inadvertently be spreading bad information when people take their stories too seriously".

Parker J. Bach wrote in Slate in 2021 that The Babylon Bee "is adept at writing ironically ambiguous material that lets audiences from different sections of the right reinforce their own beliefs ... even if The Babylon Bee's satire itself should not be considered misinformation, its satire draws on and reinforces actual misinformation and conspiracy". Bach also described the website's material as "riffs on riffs, building referential jokes atop the already referential right-wing commentary about the untrustworthiness of the news". James Varney wrote in The Washington Times that "Surprisingly often, a short piece from the Bee seems to become real news. A jesting report in the Bee will be fact-checked and censored, usually briefly, by social media platforms" and that "as a consequence, the satirical website has been fondly christened by its conservative blogging brethren as 'the paper of record.'"

=== Social media and other platforms ===
On several occasions, social media and other platforms have removed content by The Babylon Bee or flagged or suspended its accounts, though some of these actions were later described by the platforms as errors and reversed. Dillon has accused news media, fact-checking outlets, and social media websites of targeting The Babylon Bee in a movement to deplatform conservative or Christian viewpoints, which he has also described as cancel culture.

In March 2018, after The Babylon Bee's article about CNN "spinning" the news in a large washing machine was classified by fact-checking website Snopes as "false", Facebook sent a notification threatening to limit The Babylon Bee's content distribution and monetization. Following some controversy, Facebook identified the notification as a mistake and apologized.

The Babylon Bee's Twitter account was briefly suspended in August 2020 after being mistakenly caught in one of the social media company's spam filters.

In October 2020, The Babylon Bee put up a Facebook post linking to a story about the Amy Coney Barrett Supreme Court nomination, with the headline "Senator Hirono Demands ACB Be Weighed Against a Duck to See If She Is a Witch" (a reference to the 1975 film Monty Python and the Holy Grail). Citing its policies against incitement to violence, Facebook removed the post and demonetized The Babylon Bee's page on the social media platform. Dillon responded, "In what universe does a fictional quote as part of an obvious joke constitute a genuine incitement to violence? How does context not come into play here? They're asking us to edit the article and not speak publicly about internal content reviews." Also in October 2020, during a Senate hearing on Section 230, Senator Mike Lee referred to The Babylon Bee as a target of social media moderation, which he said was imbalanced and predominantly directed at right-leaning content, groups, and individuals.

The Babylon Bee put up a Facebook post in February 2022 with the headline "Trans Woman Breaks Jeopardy Record, Proving Once and for All That Men Are Smarter Than Women", referencing former Jeopardy! champion Amy Schneider. Facebook removed the post, citing its policies against hate speech. Dillon published a statement that they would be appealing the removal.

== Controversies ==
=== Snopes ===
In March 2018, The Babylon Bee published an article quipping that CNN was using an industrial-sized washing machine to "spin" the news. Two days later, fact-checking website Snopes issued a fact check for the article, rating it "false". Facebook then cited this fact check in a warning message to The Babylon Bee, threatening to limit its content distribution and monetization. Ford tweeted a screenshot of the warning message, drawing public attention to the matter. Facebook subsequently stated, "There's a difference between false news and satire. This was a mistake and should not have been rated false in our system. It's since been corrected and won't count against the domain in any way."

In July 2019, The Babylon Bee published an article referring to a real-world incident, titled "Georgia Lawmaker Claims Chick-Fil-A Employee Told Her to Go Back to Her Country, Later Clarifies He Actually Said 'My Pleasure'", which Snopes rated "false". They also suggested that the article was deliberately deceptive, rather than genuinely satirical. Ford responded on Twitter, highlighting what he deemed to be problematic wording in the fact-check. The Babylon Bee also released a statement, calling the fact-check a "smear" that was "both dishonest and disconcerting". The statement concluded by saying a law firm had been retained to represent The Babylon Bee because "Snopes appears to be actively engaged in an effort to discredit and deplatform us." Snopes later made revisions to the wording of the fact check and added an explanatory editor's note. The Babylon Bee's chief executive, Seth Dillon, appeared on Fox News in August 2019 to discuss the incident. He said The Babylon Bee must take the matter seriously "because social networks, which we depend on for our traffic, have relied upon fact-checking sources in the past to determine what's fake news and what isn't. In cases where [Snopes] is calling us fake news and lumping us in with them rather than saying this is satire, that could actually damage us. It could put our business in jeopardy." Snopes' co-founder David Mikkelson acknowledged to The New York Times that their fact-check was poorly written, but denied trying to discredit The Babylon Bee. In an interview with BuzzFeed News, Mikkelson stated, "The question you should be asking is not: 'why is Snopes addressing material from a particular site so often?' But, 'what is it about that site that makes its content trigger the fact-check threshold?'"

In August 2019, Snopes announced a new rating for satire sites called "labeled satire". Articles from The Babylon Bee that were previously rated "false" were updated with the new rating. Snopes explains the label: "This rating indicates that a claim is derived from content described by its creator and/or the wider audience as satire. Not all content described by its creator or audience as 'satire' necessarily constitutes satire, and this rating does not make a distinction between 'real' satire and content that may not be effectively recognized or understood as satire despite being labeled as such." Mann objected to this label in an op-ed published in The Wall Street Journal, writing that the label "is meant to suggest that we are somehow making jokes in bad faith".

=== Twitter ban and reinstatement ===
On March 20, 2022, The Babylon Bee's Twitter account was suspended for tweeting "The Babylon Bee's Man of the Year Is Rachel Levine", referencing then U.S. Assistant Secretary for Health, a transgender woman. Twitter said that the post violated its policy on "hateful conduct". Dillon refused to delete the tweet in order to regain access to the account, stating, "They could, of course, delete the tweet themselves. But they won't. It's not enough for them to just wipe it out. They want us to bend the knee and admit that we engaged in hateful conduct." On March 23, Twitter rejected an appeal by The Babylon Bee. Dillon told Fox News that The Babylon Bee was "disappointed" by the rejection, adding, "It doesn't change our position. They can delete our joke if they want. They have that power. But we're not bending the knee and doing it for them." Mann was also locked out of his personal account after tweeting, "Maybe they'll let us back into our Twitter account if we throw a few thousand Uighurs in a concentration camp", referring to Twitter's treatment of accounts associated with the Chinese government. Mann has denied allegations of transphobia, saying "We love trans people", and "We don't consider people like that beneath us. You know, the Christian worldview is that everybody has the opportunity to be saved and we can love everybody. I'm no more deserving of God's grace than a transgender person is. But when the culture bows down and starts handing out trophies to people for stuff like this is when we say, 'Hey, wait a minute, you know, we need to protect women in our society as well.'"

In a statement to The Washington Times on April 4, 2022, the day that Elon Musk purchased a 9.2% stake in Twitter, Dillon revealed that Elon Musk had contacted The Babylon Bee shortly after its Twitter account was suspended. "He wanted to confirm that we had, in fact, been suspended from Twitter. He reached out to us before he publicly asked his Twitter followers if they think Twitter 'rigorously adheres' to the principle of free expression. He even mused on that call with us that he might need to buy Twitter." Dillon added, "I wouldn't suggest that The Babylon Bee is the sole reason Musk decided to take action", but "I do think the absurdity of his favorite satire site getting suspended factored into his decision. Perhaps it was the last straw." Musk has repeatedly spoken positively of the Babylon Bee on Twitter. It was later revealed that Musk's ex-wife, Talulah Riley, had encouraged Musk to purchase Twitter, specifically citing The Babylon Bee's ban.

On April 14, Musk made a formal offer to buy Twitter, which was accepted on April 25. He officially acquired Twitter on October 27, and within hours directed the Trust and Safety team to urgently reinstate The Babylon Bee's account. Musk saw The Babylon Bee's suspension as emblematic of what he viewed as partisan, predominantly liberal, moderation overreach that had prompted him to acquire Twitter. In a conference with lawyer Alex Spiro and then-Trust and Safety head Yoel Roth, Musk described The Babylon Bee's tweet about Levine as "not cool", but said it did not rise to the level of violent threats that should trigger moderation action. Roth objected to reinstating the account without a clear reason, and Musk agreed to wait to restore the account until a new content policy could be published. Roth ultimately quit Twitter on November 10. On November 18, Musk reinstated the account.

On March 28, 2023, Dillon testified as an expert witness before the House Committee on Energy and Commerce's Subcommittee on Communications and Technology as part of a discussion on regulation.

=== Vivek Ramaswamy article ===
On January 16, 2024, the same day that Vivek Ramaswamy ended his campaign for the 2024 U.S. presidential election, The Babylon Bee published an article titled "Trump Promises Vivek An Administration Position Running The White House 7-Eleven". The article featured an edited picture of Ramaswamy in a 7-Eleven in the White House, wearing a 7-Eleven uniform. On Twitter, the article received criticism from both liberals and conservatives as racist for perpetuating the stereotype of Indian Americans as 7-Eleven workers. Right wing commentator Matt Walsh made a Twitter post stating users who were offended by the article were "pathetic", and asserted that Ramaswamy would not be offended. Dillon also dismissed the controversy, calling critics "stupid". Ramaswamy shared Walsh's Twitter post, and jokingly called himself a "survivor," indicating that he wasn't offended.

=== Megyn Kelly article ===
Megyn Kelly	Twitter
@megynkelly

WTF @SethDillon

November 14, 2025

The Babylon Bee	Twitter
@TheBabylonBee

Megyn Kelly Gets Rid Of Old Pager Just To Be Safe

November 13, 2025

On November 13, 2025, The Babylon Bee released a satirical article titled "Megyn Kelly Gets Rid Of Old Pager Just To Be Safe". The title was a reference to the 2024 Lebanon electronic device attacks, in which booby-trapped pagers detonated and killed dozens of people. The article was published following Megyn Kelly showing support for Tucker Carlson's interview with white nationalist Nick Fuentes, and becoming increasingly critical of Israel's role in the Gaza war.

The article was denounced by some right-wing and far-right commentators for "inciting murder," with some interpreting the article as a call for violence against Kelly Journalist Glenn Greenwald wrote that the Bee should "re-name itself The Tel Aviv Bee". Far-right activist Jake Shields asserted The Babylon Bee was "threatening to kill Megyn Kelly."

Kelly herself responded "WTF" to the article post on Twitter and tagged Dillon. The Babylon Bee soon after deleted the article. Dillon characterized negative reactions to the article as "the humorless woke right mob", stating that he deleted the article for being "uncharitable" to Kelly.

Conversely, other right-wing commentators argued that the article was a work of satire, being taken too seriously by its detractors. Tim Pool defended The Babylon Bee, stating "The Joke implies Israel assassinates Americans for criticizing them." Others perceived Kelly's reaction as hypocritical, since Kelly had previously defended a similar joke made by Ryan Girdusky against Mehdi Hasan, where Girdusky stated he hoped Hasan's "beeper doesn't go off".

=== Other controversies ===
In November 2024, the Southern Poverty Law Center published an article about The Babylon Bee and Not the Bee in reaction to their views on LGBTQ issues, stating that "their hard-right views ... have no place in our society." The article obtained personal information including occupations, full names, and social media profiles of multiple writers and staff from several sources including information from the Elance data breach. Seth Dillon stated the "dox and smear campaign against us wasn't actually journalism, but an attempt to censor speech they don't like", and Elon Musk called the SPLC a "criminal organization".

== Litigation ==
The Babylon Bee and sister site Not the Bee have been involved in supporting litigation related to free speech-related cases, both through direct lawsuits and the filing of amicus briefs at state and national levels.

=== As plaintiffs ===
In April 2023, The Babylon Bee, Tim Pool, and the Minds social network filed a lawsuit against the California Attorney General seeking an injunction against California AB 587, which was signed into law in September 2022. The bill requires social media companies to submit reports to the California Attorney General concerning their enforcement of policies against hate speech, disinformation, harassment, and extremism. The case was dismissed in August 2023.

Following the passage of AB-2355, AB-2655 and AB-2839, The Babylon Bee filed a complaint against the State of California seeking to block enforcement of the latter two bills. Filed by the Alliance Defending Freedom, the complaint alleges that the laws are overly broad and "grant California unbridled enforcement discretion." Governor Newsom has stated the bills "help to combat the harmful use of deepfakes in political ads and other content." Shortly after filing, a federal judge granted an injunction against California's enforcement of these rules stating that they "unconstitutionally stifle the free and unfettered exchange of ideas." In September 2025, a federal court ruled the California laws to be unconstitutional. In his opinion, Judge Mendez stated: "[T]he challenges launched by digital content on a global scale cannot be quashed through censorship or legislative fiat,”

A similar bill was passed in Hawaii (SB2687) aimed at political figures. Following a suit by The Babylon Bee, and Hawaii resident Dawn O'Brien a federal judge struck down the law noting that "restricts constitutionally protected political speech" and "could conceivably lead to discretionary and targeted enforcement that discriminates based on viewpoint. Hawaii chose not to appeal that decision and paid $118,000 for the Babylon Bee's legal fees.

=== Amicus briefs ===
In Novak v. City of Parma, a case arising out of a Facebook page created by Anthony Novak in March 2016 to lampoon a local police department, satire website The Onion filed an amicus brief with the Supreme Court in support of Novak, arguing the police department took action against a clearly satirical expression of speech. In October 2022, The Babylon Bee filed an amicus brief as well, supporting The Onion's position. The Babylon Bee later published, but did not file, a satirical brief in support of the police department, arguing "[i]t is essential to protect those with coercive power who wield it for self-preserving ends ... Our society can only function if people get their information from a tightly controlled source that has never lied to us, like the government or the police." The Sixth Circuit had ruled that the officers were protected by qualified immunity, and the Supreme Court declined to hear an appeal, leaving the Sixth Circuit decision in effect.

Following the 2022 passage of The Hateful Conduct Law in New York (Section 394-CCC of New York's General Business law), Eugene Volokh, the Rumble video hosting website, and the Locals crowdfunding website filed a lawsuit seeking an injunction, and a preliminary injunction was granted. New York Attorney General Letitia James filed an appeal, which prompted The Babylon Bee to file an amicus brief in September 2023, in which they described the law as "regulat[ing] almost nothing but constitutionally protected speech."

In response to legislation passed in Florida (Florida SB 7072) and Texas (Texas HB 20) in 2021 aimed to limit social media's ability to regulate content, the NetChoice trade association filed a lawsuit seeking an injunction in Moody v. NetChoice, LLC and NetChoice v. Paxton. Two federal courts of appeals split decisions, with the Fifth Circuit upholding an injunction and the Eleventh overturning an injunction. The resulting split prompted the Supreme Court to hear the cases jointly. After that announcement, The Babylon Bee and Not the Bee filed a joint amicus brief in January 2024 in support of both states' respective laws, arguing that social media companies have inconsistently applied content moderation standards to target conservative viewpoints. In the brief, both The Babylon Bee and Not the Bee claimed they had experienced censorship from large social media platforms.

== Not the Bee ==
The Dillons and Ford launched the website Not the Bee on September 1, 2020. The content on Not the Bee is not satirical. The website instead publishes strange news stories and commentary, and hosts a social media platform. Seth Dillon has described it as "a humor-based entertainment site that offers commentary on stories that are so outrageous they should be satire, but somehow aren't".

== Books, film and audio ==
=== Books ===
- The Babylon Bee, Adam Ford (2018). How to Be a Perfect Christian: Your Comprehensive Guide to Flawless Spiritual Living. Multnomah. ISBN 978-0735291522.
- The Babylon Bee (2020). The Sacred Texts of The Babylon Bee, Volume 1. Babylon Bee, T.H.E. ISBN 978-1734750508.

==== The Babylon Bee Guides ====
- The Babylon Bee, Joel Berry, Kyle Mann (2021). The Babylon Bee Guide to Wokeness. Salem Books. ISBN 978-1684512713. In the first week after publication, it ranked 20th on Amazon's top seller list, 22nd on USA Today's top seller list, and fourth on Publishers Weekly's paperback bestsellers list.
- The Babylon Bee (2022). The Babylon Bee Guide to Democracy. Salem Books. ISBN 978-1684513727.
- The Babylon Bee (2023). Babylon Bee Guide to Gender. Salem Books. ISBN 978-1684514533.
- The Babylon Bee (2024). The Babylon Bee Guide to the Apocalypse. Regnery. ISBN 978-1510781542.

=== Film ===
- "January 6th: The Most Deadliest Day". The Babylon Bee. October 11, 2024.

=== Audio ===
- The Babylon Bee (June 15, 2019). "The Babylon Bee" (Podcast).

== See also ==
- List of satirical news websites
