= NetChoice v. Bonta =

2025 legal case

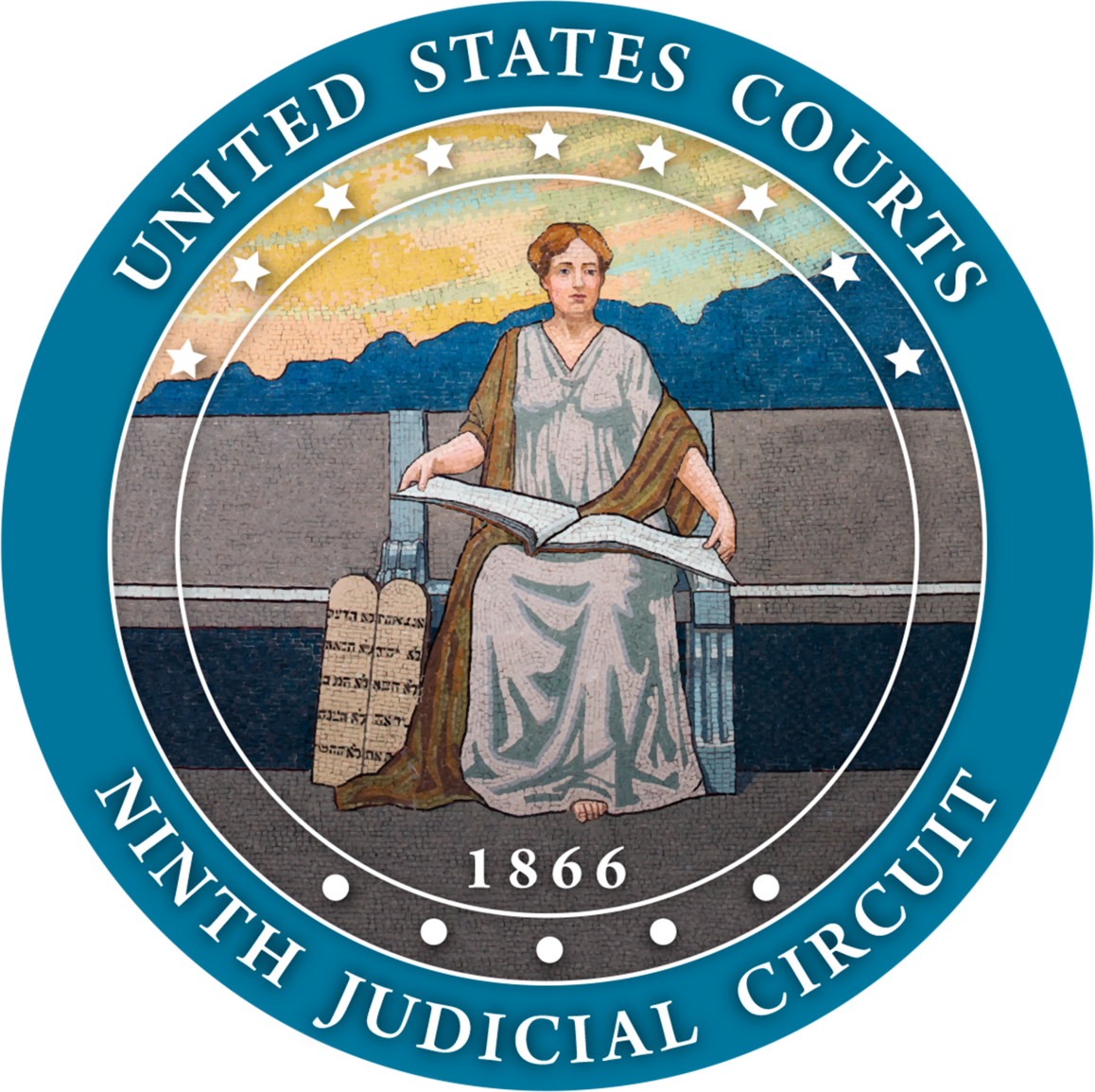
- Full case name: NetChoice v. Rob Bonta in his official capital as the Attorney General of California
- Argued: April 2, 2025
- Decided: September 9, 2025
- Docket nos.: 25-146
- Verdict: Affirmed in part, reversed in part and remanded

Case history
- Appealed from: United States District Court for the Northern District of California

Holding
- The District Court was correct to deny NetChoice's motion for a preliminary injunction relating to parental controls and restrictions on personalized feeds because NetChoice lacks standing to challenge these provisions. The private mode default setting provision is subject to intermediate scrutiny and survives it. The District Court was incorrect to deny NetChoice's challenge to the provision of the law that block minors from being able to see likes on posts; that provision is subject to strict scrutiny and does not survive it.

Court membership
- Judges sitting: Ryan D. Nelson, William A. Fletcher and Michael Daly Hawkins

Case opinions
- Opinion
- Decision by: Ryan D. Nelson joined by William A. Fletcher and Michael Daly Hawkins

Keywords
- social media

NetChoice v. Bonta is a 2025 legal case where NetChoice, a trade association of internet and social media companies, challenged California State Bill 976 and California State Bill 1144. State Bill 976 requires social media companies to restrict access to "addictive feeds" from minors without verifiable parental consent, bars social media platforms from sending notifications to minors during nighttime and school hours, and requires certain default privacy settings for minors' social media accounts.

== Legal history ==
On November 12, 2024, NetChoice, a trade association of representing social media companies including YouTube, Facebook and Instagram, filed a lawsuit in the United States District Court for the Northern District of California. NetChoice requested a preliminary injunction to block enforcement of the law before it took effect in January 2025.

A hearing was held on December 17, 2024. Judge Edward Davila expressed the view that the justices in Moody v. NetChoice had divided views on social media feeds. Judge Davila denied the motion for a preliminary injunction covering the addictive feeds, default settings, and age verification provisions, but granted the request to block the notification and disclosures provisions.

== Appeal ==
On January 2, 2025, NetChoice appealed the case to the U.S Court of Appeals for the Ninth Circuit. NetChoice asked the Ninth Circuit to extend the injunction pending their appeal. A three-judge panel on the Ninth Circuit granted this request on January 28.

On April 2, 2025, a hearing was held where NetChoice argued that the law violated the First Amendment. Judges Ryan Nelson and William Fletcher appeared skeptical of NetChoice's arguments. Judge Nelson likened the impact of social media feeds on minors to tobacco, and questioned whether NetChoice had the proper standing to sue. Judge Fletcher stated that analysis of the law might lean in the government's favor because its purpose was to protect children. The third judge on the panel, Michael Hawkins, did not indicate how he would rule.

In September 2025, in an opinion written by Judge Nelson, the Ninth Circuit ruled 3–0 that the district court was correct in denying NetChoice's preliminary injunction as to the law's addictive feeds provision. The court also found that law's provision requiring companies to create a feature stopping strangers from viewing or replying to childrens' posts survived intermediate scrutiny. However, the Ninth Circuit blocked the law's provision requiring like and share counts to be hidden on minors' posts absent parental consent, finding it likely to be unconstitutional.
