= Computer & Communications Industry Association v. Paxton =

CCIA v. Paxton and SEAT v. Paxton
- Court: U.S District Court for the Western District of Texas
- Full case name: Computer & Communications Industry Association, Plaintiff, v. Ken Paxton, in his official capacity as Attorney General of Texas, Defendant. Students Engaged in Advancing Texas et al, Plaintiff, v. Ken Paxton, in his official capacity as Attorney General of Texas, Defendant.
- Argued: December 16, 2025
- Decided: December 23, 2025
- Docket nos.: 1:25-cv-01660 1:25-cv-01662
- Verdict: Preliminary injunction is granted

Case history
- Appealed to: United States Court of Appeals for the Fifth Circuit

Ruling
- SB 2420 Triggers Strict Scrutiny under the First Amendment of the United States Constitution and fails Strict Scrutiny.

Court membership
- Judge sitting: Robert Pitman

Case opinions
- CCIA Opinion SEAT Opinion

Computer & Communications Industry Association v. Paxton or simply CCIA v. Paxton and Students Engaged in Advancing Texas v. Paxton or simply SEAT v. Paxton are federal lawsuits challenging the constitutionality of Texas SB 2420, arguing it violates the First Amendment of the United States Constitution. Both CCIA and SEAT also challenged the SCOPE Act of Texas.

The law in question requires appstores to verify the age of users. Users under 18 must have verified parental consent to download an app or complete in-app purchases. The law also requires apps to set age ratings for their apps, and developers can have access to the data on the status of age verification and parental consent. The main point of the law is to shift the burden of age verification to the appstore level.

So far at least two other states other than Texas have passed Appstore Age Verification laws in the same vein as this, those being Utah and Louisiana, with New Hampshire introducing a similar bill for its 2026 legislative session. Tim Cook, CEO of Apple, has criticized these types of laws as invading privacy and stated that there are better proposed laws to protect children. Apple is a member of the Computer & Communications Industry Association.

On December 23, 2025, Federal Judge Robert Pitman blocked the law from taking effect, saying that the law triggered strict scrutiny and that it didn't survive it. Texas Attorney General Ken Paxton immediately appealed the ruling, and on January 23, 2026, filed a motion requesting a stay of the injunction during the appeals process.

On May 6, 2026, Federal Judge Robert Pitman denied Paxton's motion to stay the injunction during the appeal process.

== See also ==
- Computer & Communications Industry Association v. Uthmeier, a similar lawsuit in Florida
- Moody v. NetChoice, Supreme Court case which CCIA is a part of
- Texas SB 2420 (2025), Texas Appstore Age Verification Legislation
