= Algorithmic amplification =

Concept concerning content amplification by recommendation systems

One conceptual model of amplification, in which engagement-based ranking distributes a creator's post beyond the creator's direct follower network

Algorithmic amplification describes increases in the distribution or visibility of content on digital platforms, arising from a combination of automated ranking by recommendation systems and users' own sharing. Definitions differ over the baseline used to determine whether content has been amplified, and separating the contribution of ranking from that of users is a recurring difficulty in the research. Major platforms, including Facebook, YouTube, TikTok, and X (formerly Twitter), use such systems to determine what appears in users' feeds and search results. The term is used in research on social media and digital media regulation to describe how platform design choices influence the distribution of online information.

A feed can be ordered by time, with the newest post at the top. Algorithmic systems order it by prediction instead. They score each post by how likely a particular user is to watch it, click on it, or reply to it, and by how long that user is likely to stay with it. Material that scores well may be shown to progressively larger audiences through feeds, suggested videos, and search results. A video that many people watch to the end, for instance, can reach users who do not follow the account that posted it. That early attention can feed back into the model that ranks what users are shown next. Recommendation systems also support content discovery and public-interest communication, and their ranking decisions shape the visibility and income of creators and news organisations.

Algorithmic amplification has been linked to the spread of misinformation, the circulation of extremist and other harmful material, and to concerns about young users' mental health. It also features in debates about filter bubbles and echo chambers, and about political polarisation. A systematic review of digital media use classified most reported associations with polarisation as detrimental to democracy. Research isolating the effect of ranking has varied across platforms and methods. Studies of X have found uneven amplification of political content, while large experiments on Facebook and Instagram found limited effects on users' attitudes. A study of YouTube that used automated accounts to isolate the effect of its recommendation system found that user preferences played a larger role than recommendations in determining partisan consumption. Researchers have also examined how state actors and automated accounts use recommendation systems to shape what is seen. The scale and direction of these effects remain debated, in part because independent researchers have limited access to platform systems. News organisations reported that internal Meta documents released by former employees indicated that engagement-based ranking rewarded divisive content; Meta disputed the claims.

Governments in the European Union, United Kingdom, United States, and China have taken differing approaches to regulating recommendation systems. The EU's Digital Services Act requires the largest platforms to assess and mitigate systemic risks associated with recommendation systems, and to offer users at least one recommendation option not based on profiling. The UK's Online Safety Act 2023 requires services to assess risks arising from algorithms and, under Ofcom's child-safety codes, requires some providers to filter harmful content from children's feeds. A House of Commons committee concluded in 2025 that the Act did not adequately address the amplification of legal but harmful content. At federal level in the United States, Congress has considered several proposals, while courts have considered whether platforms are liable for what their algorithms recommend and whether ranking constitutes protected speech. China's provisions on algorithmic recommendations, in force since March 2022, require providers to let users turn off personalised recommendations, and some providers to file details of their algorithms with the state.

== Terminology ==
Definitions of algorithmic amplification vary. A 2024 review by Jonathan Stray and colleagues notes that platforms can give an item very large distribution in a short time through information cascades, which arise from a combination of user sharing and algorithmic recommendation, and that amplification is a reasonable name for that phenomenon. The same review observes that "amplification" appears in several proposed laws but is difficult to translate into operational terms, that many definitions of "amplified" collapse into content merely being shown once parsed carefully, and that measuring amplification requires a baseline whose choice is itself disputed. They conclude that amplification is not a well-defined measure for most recommender systems.

The term is also used in policy documents. A 2025 report by the House of Commons Science, Innovation and Technology Committee used "algorithmic amplification" in its discussion of recommendation systems and harmful content online.

Legislation and legislative proposals have also addressed the systems concerned. The European Union's Digital Services Act (DSA) identifies recommendation systems as a potential source of systemic risk. In the United States, the Filter Bubble Transparency Act proposed requiring platforms operating what it called an "opaque algorithm" to make available a version using an "input-transparent algorithm", defined as one that does not use user-specific data unless that data was expressly provided by the user for the purpose of determining what information would be shown.

== Development of recommendation systems ==
Modern recommendation systems predate social media. A 2021 overview in AI Magazine by Dietmar Jannach and colleagues traced the origins of modern recommendation systems to the early 1990s, when they were first used experimentally for personal email and information filtering. The 1992 Tapestry mail system and the 1994 GroupLens news filtering system were early milestones before recommendation systems spread into e-commerce and other online services. As large platforms developed during the 2000s, they increasingly sorted, filtered and highlighted material rather than merely hosting it. The communications scholar Tarleton Gillespie argues that content-sharing platforms present themselves as hosts of user content while playing down how they intervene, including by sorting content, highlighting some posts over others, and filtering what users see.

Facebook introduced its News Feed in 2006. In a 2016 company explanation, Facebook said that stories were ranked so users saw material it predicted they cared about first. YouTube altered its suggested-videos and search ranking algorithms in 2012 to prioritise watch time over clicks, saying it wanted to "better surface the videos that viewers actually watch, over those that they click on and then abandon". TikTok, launched internationally in 2018, adopted a model in which its primary content surface, the For You feed, is driven almost entirely by algorithmic recommendation rather than by a user's social graph. An internal document obtained by The New York Times in 2021 showed that the platform's algorithm optimised for retention and time spent, using signals such as watch duration, replays, likes, and comments to score and rank videos.

Algorithmic recommendation also became central to platforms outside social media. Spotify's personalised features, including Discover Weekly, Release Radar, and Home recommendations, use behavioural signals and inferred "taste profiles" to surface tracks and artists beyond a listener's existing library. An ethnographic study of music curators at streaming platforms described this blend of algorithmic and human editorial selection as an "algo-torial" model of gatekeeping, through which playlist placement can substantially increase a track's reach. Amazon adopted item-based collaborative filtering for product recommendations in 1998, and its recommendation engine has been described as one of the earliest large-scale deployments of recommendation technology in e-commerce, shaping product visibility for many shoppers.

Law professor Amy Adler has argued that adult content platforms exhibit recommendation dynamics comparable to those of mainstream speech platforms. Beginning in 2007, she wrote, the pornography industry shifted to algorithm-driven streaming platforms, most of which are controlled by a single near-monopoly company, Aylo (formerly MindGeek). Adler argued that Aylo's sites use algorithmic search engines and suggestions, rigid categorisation, and AI-driven search term optimisation to constrain what users encounter. She compared their effects with those of mainstream speech platforms, including filter bubbles, feedback loops, and the tendency of algorithmic suggestions to alter individual preferences.

== Mechanisms ==
A simplified recommendation pipeline showing how content can be filtered and ranked into a personalised feed

A platform holds far more content than any user could look at, so a recommendation system chooses on the user's behalf. It predicts how useful each item would be to that user, then narrows a large catalogue down to a short ranked list of the highest-scoring items. Two techniques are commonly combined to make those predictions. Collaborative filtering works out a user's likely preferences from the behaviour of users who have behaved similarly. Machine-learning models predict which content a user is likely to engage with, based on what that user has done before.

Engagement-based ranking systems score content by predicting whether a user will interact with it, using signals such as clicks, shares, likes, replies, video watching, and time spent on a post. Users' revealed preferences, expressed through this behaviour, do not always align with the preferences they state when surveyed.

The feedback loop in a recommender system: user interactions feed back into the model that ranks what they are shown next

Popularity signals can create feedback dynamics in which early engagement increases the likelihood that content will be shown to additional users. Experimental research on online cultural markets has demonstrated how such feedback processes can produce unequal visibility outcomes even when initial differences in content quality are small. As users consume recommendations and their responses are fed back into the model, recommender systems can enter a feedback loop. Simulation studies have found that such loops can amplify popularity bias, reduce the diversity of recommended items, and homogenise users' preferences over time.

== Beneficial and public-interest uses ==
Recommendation systems can help users navigate large volumes of content by surfacing material predicted to match users' interests or needs, which can improve discoverability on platforms with large content libraries. In public health communication, platforms can help health authorities distribute timely information at scale, though the same systems also risk amplifying misinformation alongside official guidance.

Social media platforms have also been used during emergencies to share situational information and coordinate relief efforts. They have become a significant channel for public participation and back-channel communication in crises, while also carrying risks of obsolete or inaccurate information, rumour propagation, and false or misleading information.

On music-streaming platforms, recommendation systems act as cultural intermediaries between listeners and music. A 2023 UK government report surveyed music creators and polled about 4,000 consumers. Of the creators responding, 89.2 per cent were concerned that bias in recommendation could lead to particular artists or labels being prioritised, against 49 per cent of consumers concerned about an effect on their own listening; the creator survey drew 102 responses and was not representative. The report concluded that evidence proving or disproving unfair bias was mixed and at times inconclusive, and cited figures from streaming providers indicating that around 70 per cent of listening remains user-led rather than guided by recommendation.

Musicologist Georgina Born and computer scientist Fernando Diaz have argued that recommendation algorithms for cultural content should promote diversity and a commonality of experience rather than optimise solely for individual engagement. They drew on the programming traditions of public service broadcasting organisations such as the BBC.

== Effects on information ecosystems ==
Research on algorithmic amplification has examined how it shapes the wider information environment. Much of this work concerns the spread of misinformation and harmful content, and the visibility and revenues of creators and news outlets. Other studies address filter bubbles, political polarisation, the effects on young users' mental health, and the use of recommendation systems by state actors.

=== Misinformation and harmful content ===
A 2018 study by Soroush Vosoughi and colleagues found that false stories on Twitter (now X) reached more people and travelled faster than true ones. The study found that bots accelerated the spread of true and false news at the same rate, suggesting that humans rather than bots accounted for the difference. Reviewing that finding, Stray and colleagues, several of whom work at technology companies, wrote that it is unclear how far the faster circulation reflects recommendation algorithms rather than users' own creation and sharing.

Stray and colleagues distinguish radicalisation from polarisation. Radicalisation involves a small number of individuals violating mainstream norms and sometimes turning to violence, rather than a broad hardening of divisions across a population. They wrote that documented cases involving online recommendations also featured chat rooms, personal relationships, user-directed searches and life circumstances. Systematic studies, they added, have generally found recommenders shifting the content mix towards engagement, while producing weak evidence of radicalising potential because their designs lacked statistical power. They cited abuses committed by the military against the Rohingya minority in Myanmar as a notable case of hate speech and disinformation on social media. Amnesty International went further, arguing that Facebook's news feed, groups and recommendation features actively amplified anti-Rohingya hatred in the years before the 2017 atrocities.

Joe Whittaker and colleagues tested personalised recommendation on YouTube and Reddit with automated accounts over two weeks in January and February 2019. The first week provided a baseline in which the accounts did not interact with content. During the second, one account interacted mainly with far-right material, another mainly with apolitical material, while a third remained non-interacting. The design accounted for personalisation, which earlier empirical studies had not modelled. On YouTube, the far-right account was twice as likely to be shown content classified as extreme. The neutral and non-interacting accounts were 2.96 and 3.23 times less likely to be shown extreme content. Reddit showed no statistically significant comparable effect. Gab was studied separately by comparing its Popular, Controversial and Latest timelines. Technical disruption left only five sessions, so the authors treated the Gab analysis as exploratory. They found no statistically significant promotion of extreme content, although the Popular timeline prioritised fringe content over moderate.

=== Creator visibility and economic effects ===
A small number of dominant platforms concentrate the distribution of algorithmically directed audience attention. Because they can act as gatekeepers over the content they disseminate, flaws or biases in their algorithmic curation systems can have a considerable impact. Platforms maximise the value of their audiences by increasing audience size, time spent and user interaction, which supplies the data used to target messages to advertisers. The sociologist Zeynep Tufekci describes how the civic space that had developed online through personal blogs and web pages shifted, from about 2005, onto large centralised platforms whose owners decided through ranking what users encountered, under business models built on page views. Gatekeeping for entry to the public sphere, she writes, now operates through platforms' policies, their algorithms and the affordances they offer.

That gatekeeping position can shape what publishers produce as well as what readers see. Juliane Lischka and Marcel Garz combined machine classification with time-series analysis of Facebook posts and Twitter messages from 37 German legacy news outlets over 54 months from January 2013, modelling clickbait supply as a game in which outlets do not know how much their audience will tolerate. Clickbait was infrequent, averaging 5.9 per cent of Facebook posts and 2.8 per cent of tweets, with a few outlets using it far more heavily than the rest. Supply and subsequent user interaction formed an inverted U: interaction rose as outlets posted more clickbait, then fell beyond a turning point the authors calculated at 21 per cent of posts on Facebook and 6 per cent on Twitter. Testing whether algorithmic curation itself increases clickbait, they compared Twitter before and after it introduced ranking and rejected the hypothesis: neither the 2015 testing phase nor the 2016 global roll-out was associated with an increase, and clickbait had already been growing while the platform remained chronological.

The adoption of generative artificial intelligence tools from 2023 onwards has lowered the cost of content production and increased the amount of material available for ranking. Game-theoretic modelling by the marketing scholars Tianxin Zou, Zijun Shi and Yue Wu examined the consequences. It predicts that where such tools raise the quality of low-quality content only modestly, the influx crowds out high-quality content. That reduces consumer welfare and creators' total profit, with a stronger effect where platforms screen for quality. These are modelled rather than measured outcomes.

=== Filter bubbles and echo chambers ===
A filter bubble (left), in which an algorithm selects what a single user sees, compared with an echo chamber (right), in which like-minded users circulate shared content among themselves

The idea that algorithmic personalisation can narrow users' exposure to information is often expressed through two related concepts. The internet activist Eli Pariser coined the term filter bubble for personalised filters that create a distinct information environment for each user based on predictions about what they will do and want next. The related echo chamber concept, associated with the legal scholar Cass Sunstein, concerns users' growing ability to filter what they see and providers' growing ability to filter information for them. This can reduce unplanned exposure to views they would not have chosen in advance.

A 2023 systematic review by Philipp Lorenz-Spreen and colleagues found that evidence on echo chambers points in different directions depending on the outcome measured. Several articles looking at news consumption reported that social media and search engines diversified people's news diets, while studies of social network structure consistently found ideologically homogeneous clusters. The authors suggested that context and the specific outcome measured might resolve the contradiction, and listed it among the gaps in the literature. The review examined 496 articles on digital media use and political variables, and for the ten most frequently studied variables it classified 354 reported associations as beneficial or detrimental to democracy. In every one of those articles the factor being tested was a measure of digital media use, such as online news consumption or social media uptake. Stray and colleagues put the recommender-specific position more sharply, writing that there is little evidence that filter bubbles or a lack of diversity are driving polarisation. They noted that the language of filter bubbles and echo chambers has covered a range of phenomena, including self-selected consumption, homophily in social networks and algorithmic feedback effects.

Individual studies differ in what they measure. A 2015 study of 10.1 million United States Facebook users isolated the ranking algorithm's own contribution. It reduced exposure to ideologically cross-cutting content by about 15 per cent, less than users' own choices about what to click. An analysis of 50,000 United States news readers' browsing histories took a different approach. It associated search engines and social networks both with greater ideological distance between individuals and with greater exposure to material from a reader's less preferred side. Its authors judged the overall effects modest, since most online news consumption came from direct visits to mainstream outlets. A 2018 survey-based study concluded that few people are ideologically enclosed, because most use a range of media sources.

=== Political content and polarisation ===
Amplification of the largest mainstream parties' tweets in the two countries with the strongest effect in the Huszár study, relative to a reverse-chronological timeline

The same review found that a clear majority of the articles measuring polarisation reported associations that its authors classified as detrimental to democracy. Across all the political variables the review covered, 24 articles reported causal evidence, and on polarisation these largely supported the correlational pattern. Some articles found balanced online discourse and others found potentially depolarising effects, and results varied between countries. The authors cautioned against generalising findings from one political setting, such as the United States, to others. They also noted the absence of a baseline. How a polarisation study is read depends on whether social media are taken to have raised or lowered exposure to opposing views, and much less is known about offline exposure. Stray and colleagues characterised the causal evidence as mixed, observing that polarisation in the United States began increasing decades before social media. They added that optimising for engagement can prioritise divisive content, and that several lines of evidence suggest this mechanism exacerbates polarisation.

Studies that measure what ranking amplifies have found uneven treatment of political content. One drew on a long-running randomised experiment whose control group of nearly two million daily active Twitter accounts received a reverse-chronological feed. At aggregate party level the ranked timeline amplified the mainstream right more than the mainstream left in six of seven countries, most strongly in Canada and the United Kingdom. It also found greater aggregate amplification of right-leaning US news sources, though results varied with the media-bias classification used, and it did not identify a cause. At individual level, amplification was not significantly associated with politicians' party affiliation, and far-left and far-right parties were generally amplified less than centrist ones. A 2025 sock-puppet audit of X during the 2024 United States presidential election found that both left- and right-leaning accounts received amplified exposure to ideologically aligned content. Newly created accounts following no one received a default right-leaning bias, and the algorithm amplified political commentators and influencers alongside traditional media and political figures. A separate 2025 audit compared engagement-based ranking on X with a reverse-chronological baseline. It found that the ranked feed amplified content hostile to members of opposing political groups, and that users did not prefer that content when asked to evaluate it directly.

Studies measuring users' attitudes or consumption, rather than the content selected, have found limited or moderating effects. Large-scale experiments on Facebook and Instagram during the 2020 United States presidential election found that algorithmic ranking altered the mix of political content users encountered. It produced limited measurable effects on political attitudes or polarisation over the study period. A 2024 study of YouTube used automated accounts to replay real users' viewing histories, then compared them with accounts that followed recommendations under fixed rules. On average the algorithm pushed users towards more moderate content, most strongly for heavy consumers of partisan material. Its authors concluded that user preferences played a larger role than recommendations in determining consumption patterns.

Search ranking has been studied on the same question, with different results depending on whether the ranking is manipulated experimentally or observed in use. Controlled experiments involving 4,556 undecided voters in the United States and India found that biased rankings could shift voting preferences by 20 per cent or more. Most participants were unaware of the manipulation, and the researchers termed this the search engine manipulation effect. Studies of live search have attributed observed imbalances to other causes. An audit of Google's Top Stories box found impressions concentrated among a few mainstream outlets, with left-leaning sources accounting for 62.4 per cent against 11.3 per cent. Its authors attributed this principally to the greater volume of material published by left-leaning outlets rather than to algorithmic bias. A study tracked real users' Google Search activity during the 2018 and 2020 US elections. It found that partisan identification related only weakly to the sources Google showed users, and more strongly to the sources users chose to click.

=== Mental health and minors ===
Most reviews of the evidence on social media and adolescent mental health have found the associations weak or inconsistent. Patti M. Valkenburg, Adrian Meier and Ine Beyens surveyed 25 such reviews published between 2019 and mid-2021, comprising seven meta-analyses, nine systematic reviews and nine narrative reviews. A few described the associations as substantial and deleterious. Twenty-one of the 25 agreed that the evidence was primarily cross-sectional, so that causal conclusions were not warranted.

Little of that literature isolates ranking. Stray and colleagues wrote that evidence on the effects of recommender systems on well-being conflicts, partly because well-being is defined in different ways. Most studies, they added, have not been designed to separate algorithmic content selection from other aspects of social media, such as users' own creation and sharing.

Investigations of individual platforms have nonetheless reported rapid narrowing towards harmful material. A Wall Street Journal investigation found that TikTok's algorithm could narrow recommendations towards material related to self-harm, eating disorders or drug use within hours of a user showing interest in adjacent content. A 2023 Amnesty International report reached similar conclusions about TikTok's For You feed, arguing that targeted recommendations could rapidly intensify exposure to depressive and self-harm-related material among vulnerable young users.

=== State use and control ===
The decentralised model described by Lu and colleagues, in which content flows between central and local government-linked accounts and is then promoted algorithmically

Research has examined how state-linked actors seek algorithmic visibility through government-affiliated content and coordinated automated accounts. Other work has examined how users respond to perceived algorithmic suppression. A 2026 study by Yingdan Lu and colleagues identified more than 18,000 regime-affiliated accounts on Douyin (the Chinese sister app of TikTok) that posted over five million videos. The authors characterised this as a decentralised state propaganda system, arguing that controlling the platform's ranking algorithms could not by itself reach fragmented audiences. The model instead mobilised large numbers of government-linked accounts, whose varied content flowed between central and local accounts and could then be promoted algorithmically.

A study of Persian-language Twitter during the first wave of the COVID-19 pandemic found that pro-regime clusters contained a high proportion of bot accounts, one consisting of 76 per cent automated users. These used framing strategies similar to those of human regime supporters, but operated in a coordinated manner to amplify pro-government narratives and suppress dissent. Anti-regime communities also contained automated accounts, though their clusters were primarily directed by non-bot users. Users can also respond to perceived suppression. A 2025 study of Palestinian social media users during the May 2021 Sheikh Jarrah events found that activists reported shadow banning and content demotion on Instagram and Facebook. They developed circumvention strategies such as altering language, using coded terms and coordinating posting schedules to maintain visibility within algorithmic ranking systems.

== Methods of study ==
Research on algorithmic amplification is constrained by limited independent access to the internal workings of platform recommendation systems. A 2021 report by the Ada Lovelace Institute identified six technical methods available for auditing such systems: code audits, user surveys, scraping audits, API audits, sock puppet audits, and crowdsourced audits, each with its own limitations and challenges.

Evidence has also come from randomised experiments conducted by the platforms themselves. The Huszár et al. study of Twitter's recommendation algorithm used a long-running randomised experiment maintained by the platform, in which a control group of nearly two million daily active accounts received a reverse-chronological feed rather than an algorithmically ranked one. Meta ran similar experiments in 2020, in which it deactivated algorithmic ranking for randomly selected Facebook and Instagram users during the US presidential election. Platform-run experiments can provide large samples and controlled comparisons, but external scrutiny depends on companies granting access to their systems and data.

A sock-puppet audit: automated accounts with controlled profiles use a platform, and the recommendations returned to each account are recorded and compared

Where platform cooperation is unavailable, researchers have used external methods. Sock-puppet audits create artificial accounts with controlled characteristics to observe what content is recommended to them. The Ye, Luceri, and Ferrara audit deployed 120 sock-puppet accounts across four political orientations on X during the 2024 US presidential election, collecting over nine million recommended posts over six weeks. The method allows researchers to isolate algorithmic behaviour from individual user choices, but the artificial accounts do not interact with content as real users do, raising questions about ecological validity. A 2024 simulation study by Paul Bouchaud and Pedro Ramaciotti found that design choices in sock-puppet audits, including the number of accounts followed and the length of simulated browsing sessions, could alter the conclusions drawn about the same platform.

Data donation studies take a different approach, recruiting real users to install browser extensions that record the recommendations they receive. The approach captures genuine user experience but introduces self-selection bias, since participants may not be representative of the wider user population.

Independent auditing has also been pursued through multi-stakeholder initiatives. Governments and technology companies adopted the Christchurch Call in May 2019, after the Christchurch mosque attacks. It included a commitment to review how companies' algorithms direct users towards terrorist and violent extremist content. Its Initiative on Algorithmic Outcomes was established in 2022 to develop privacy-preserving tools for such research. It reported in November 2024 that independent researchers had audited recommender systems at LinkedIn and Dailymotion, while platform data remained protected, and a second phase examined governance and ethics frameworks for it.

These methodological constraints have informed regulatory responses. The DSA requires very large online platforms, defined as those with more than 45 million monthly active users in the European Union, to provide data access to approved researchers. Under section 77 of the Online Safety Act 2023, Ofcom must require annual transparency reports from providers of categorised services. Schedule 8 lists matters those reports may cover, including the design and operation of algorithms affecting the display, promotion, restriction or recommendation of illegal content or content harmful to children.

== Regulation ==
Governments have taken markedly different approaches to regulating recommendation systems. The European Union and United Kingdom impose transparency and risk-assessment duties on large platforms. In the United States, several bills have been introduced. China requires providers to let users disable personalised recommendations, and some of them to file algorithm details with regulators.

=== European Union ===
The DSA became fully applicable to all platforms by 17 February 2024. It requires very large online platforms to assess and mitigate systemic risks associated with recommendation systems, including risks to public discourse, fundamental rights, and the mental health of minors. Platforms must offer users at least one recommendation option not based on profiling. Article 27 of the DSA requires transparency about how recommendations are generated, while Articles 34 and 35 impose additional obligations on very large online platforms and search engines. The European Commission has applied those duties to recommendation systems in enforcement action. In February 2024 it opened formal proceedings against TikTok, examining whether the design of the platform's systems, including its algorithmic systems, might stimulate behavioural addiction or create what the Commission termed rabbit hole effects. The proceedings also covered default privacy settings for minors within the design and functioning of TikTok's recommender systems. In May 2024 it opened proceedings against Meta on comparable grounds, saying it was concerned that the systems of Facebook and Instagram, including their algorithms, might stimulate behavioural addictions in children.

In February 2026 the Commission issued preliminary findings that TikTok's addictive design breached the Act. It named infinite scroll, autoplay, push notifications and the platform's highly personalised recommender system, and said TikTok had not adequately assessed how those features could harm users' physical and mental well-being, including that of minors and vulnerable adults. The Commission considered that TikTok would need to change the basic design of its service, among other things by adapting its recommender system. The findings do not prejudge the outcome, and a confirmed breach could carry a fine of up to 6 per cent of worldwide annual turnover.

In July 2026 the Commission issued further preliminary findings in the same proceedings, concerning TikTok's account settings for minors. It said that the public-account setting allowed content published by 16- and 17-year-olds to be recommended to any other user through the For You feed, and that TikTok should stop recommending minors' content in that way. The Commission stated that its investigation into the rabbit hole effect of TikTok's recommender systems remained ongoing.

In April 2026 the Commission preliminarily found Meta in breach of the DSA for failing to prevent children under 13 from using Facebook and Instagram. It stated that its investigation into addictive behaviour and rabbit-hole effects remained ongoing. The preliminary findings did not prejudge the outcome.

=== United Kingdom ===
The Online Safety Act 2023 requires providers to assess how algorithms may increase users' exposure to illegal content and children's exposure to harmful content. Providers must then mitigate identified risks through their systems, design and algorithms. Illegal-content duties became enforceable on 17 March 2025. Services likely to be accessed by children had to complete child-risk assessments by 24 July 2025. The communications regulator Ofcom finalised its Protection of Children Codes of Practice under the Act on 24 April 2025. From 25 July 2025, providers must configure certain recommender systems to filter harmful content from children's feeds. The duty applies where a provider's risk assessment rates the system as medium or high risk for that content.

In July 2025, the House of Commons Science, Innovation and Technology Committee concluded that the Online Safety Act did not adequately address the algorithmic amplification of legal but harmful content. The committee cited the 2024 Southport riots and recommended that platforms deprioritise content found misleading by fact-checkers. It also said that government lacked accurate, current information about recommendation algorithms and recommended independent research to inform future standards and duties. University of Sussex scholars giving evidence to the committee argued that the Act lacks safety duties focused specifically on the development and adoption of recommendation algorithms. They acknowledged that its broader risk duties can apply to algorithmic systems.

The Online Safety Act's categorisation framework also raised questions about how regulation designed for platforms that use algorithmic recommendation applies to those that do not. In 2025, the Wikimedia Foundation filed a judicial review challenging the categorisation regulations, which it said could place Wikipedia under the Act's strictest tier of obligations. The foundation argued that Category 1 duties, among them user identity verification, would undermine the privacy and safety of its volunteer contributors and expose the encyclopaedia to manipulation and vandalism. The High Court dismissed the challenge in August 2025. It stated that the ruling did not give Ofcom or the government "a green light to implement a regime that would significantly impede Wikipedia's operations". The foundation could bring a further challenge if Ofcom wrongly concluded that Wikipedia fell within Category 1.

Ofcom published the register of categorised services on 30 June 2026. Category 1 designation applies to services that exceed a user-number threshold and use a content recommender system, and eleven services were placed in that category, among them Facebook, Instagram, TikTok, X, and YouTube. Wikipedia was not designated, but was added to a separate list of emerging Category 1 services, which carries no additional duties under the Act. The Wikimedia Foundation said it was relieved by the decision, while noting that Wikipedia could be reassessed at any time.

=== United States ===
The Filter Bubble Transparency Act, introduced in 2021, sought to require platforms to offer alternatives to algorithmically ranked feeds. The Kids Online Safety Act (KOSA) was introduced as S.1409 in 2023. It would require covered platforms to let minors opt out of personalised recommendation systems, and would impose a duty of care concerning harms linked to platform design. The Senate passed it in July 2024, and a new bill, S.1748, was introduced in May 2025. In June 2026, the House of Representatives passed the Kids Internet and Digital Safety (KIDS) Act by 267 votes to 117. The bill would require platforms to offer children ways to limit addictive features and to adopt policies addressing harms including sexual exploitation. The Senate had supported stronger standards including a duty of care, setting up a potential conflict between the chambers.

At the state level, New York's Stop Addictive Feeds Exploitation (SAFE) For Kids Act was signed into law in June 2024. It restricts algorithmically personalised feeds for users under 18 unless parental consent is granted. Without consent, minors are to be shown content only from accounts they follow or otherwise select, in a set sequence such as chronological order. The state attorney general issued final rules on 28 July 2026, and the Act takes effect 180 days after their publication, on 25 January 2027.

Federal courts have considered how existing law applies to algorithmic recommendation. In Gonzalez v. Google LLC (2023), the family of a victim of the November 2015 Paris attacks sued Google over the use of YouTube by ISIS and its supporters. The Supreme Court granted review to consider the Ninth Circuit's application of Section 230. It declined to decide that question because the complaint appeared to state little, if any, plausible claim independently of Section 230. The Court instead vacated the judgment and remanded the case for reconsideration in light of Twitter, Inc. v. Taamneh.

The Third Circuit later addressed Section 230 directly in Anderson v. TikTok (2024). The mother of a ten-year-old girl who died after attempting the "blackout challenge" alleged that TikTok's algorithm had recommended a video of the challenge to her daughter. The court held that the recommendations themselves were TikTok's own "expressive activity", although the videos were third-party content. Section 230 therefore did not bar claims based on those recommendations. The panel relied in part on Moody v. NetChoice (2024), which treated platforms' editorial choices about selecting and ranking third-party content as protected expression. The Third Circuit denied TikTok's petition for panel rehearing and rehearing en banc in October 2024.

=== China ===
The Provisions on the Management of Algorithmic Recommendations in Internet Information Services were issued jointly by the Cyberspace Administration of China, the Ministry of Industry and Information Technology, the Ministry of Public Security and the State Administration for Market Regulation. They took effect on 1 March 2022. Providers must offer users either an option not targeted at their individual characteristics or a convenient means of turning algorithmic recommendation off. They must stop the service at once when a user chooses to do so. The Provisions also prohibit using algorithmic recommendation to transmit information barred by law, to induce addiction to the internet among minors, or to differentiate transaction prices unreasonably on the basis of consumers' preferences, habits or other traits. Providers whose services have public-opinion properties or a capacity for social mobilisation must file with the Cyberspace Administration within ten working days of beginning to operate. The filing must give the provider's name, service form, field of application and algorithm type, together with a self-assessment report and the content to be displayed. The media scholar Jian Xu writes that this was China's first regulation of algorithms to carry legal force, and notes that it takes the form of a departmental regulation, the lowest tier of the Chinese legal hierarchy. In August 2022, the Cyberspace Administration published a list of 30 algorithms used in popular applications, including products operated by Alibaba, Tencent, ByteDance and Baidu. Xu records that 262 providers had filed by April 2023.

Xu has argued that the ideological and political implications of algorithmic applications are the primary concern of Chinese regulators, and that the Cyberspace Administration's lead role reflects this priority. The regulatory framework was developed in three phases: initial post-event penalties against technology companies, followed by ethics guidelines and industry self-discipline pacts, and then binding legislation. Xu noted that the transparency requirements apply only to algorithms used by commercial platforms, not to those used for government decision-making or public administration. He describes China as the first country to enact and apply laws regulating algorithms and generative artificial intelligence.

== Debate ==
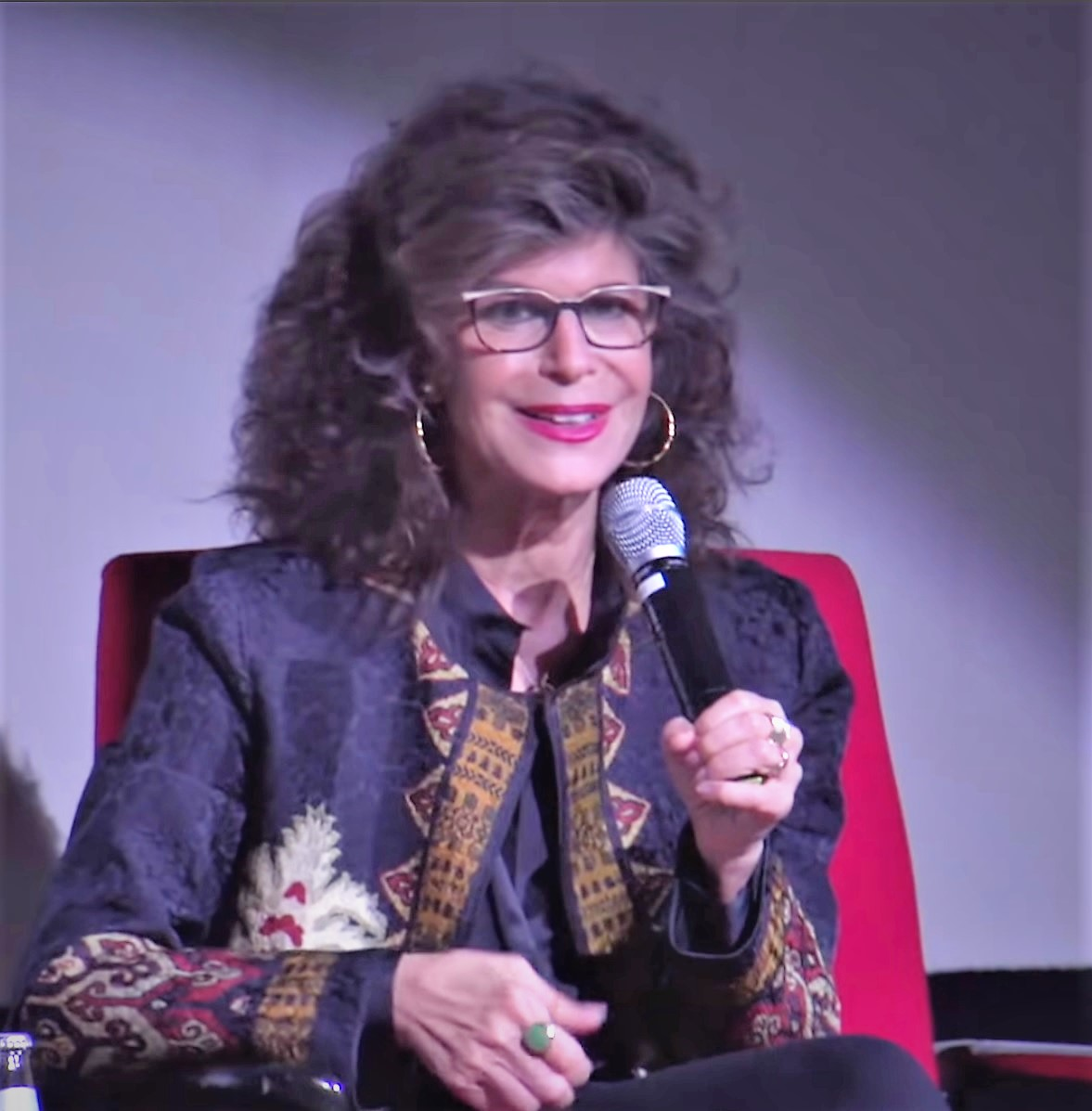
Shoshana Zuboff, whose critique of engagement-driven recommendation forms one strand of the debate

Academic and policy debate about algorithmic amplification has concerned both the design of engagement-driven recommendation and how large its effects are relative to other factors shaping information consumption.

In The Age of Surveillance Capitalism, Shoshana Zuboff argues that surveillance revenues drive the accumulation of ever more predictive behavioural data. The most predictive data of all, she writes, comes from behaviour that has already been modified towards a guaranteed outcome. On her account, surveillance capitalists claim a right to modify other people's behaviour for profit, by methods that bypass their awareness and their own decision-making. Born and Diaz have argued from a cultural theory perspective that personalisation in recommender systems weakens the shared experiences on which cultural citizenship depends.

The political debate about algorithmic amplification in the United States has been shaped by competing claims. Republican politicians, including those on the House Judiciary Committee, have alleged that platforms suppress conservative viewpoints through content moderation and ranking. Florida and Texas enacted laws in 2021 restricting platforms' content-moderation choices, including on viewpoint grounds. The 2021 NYU Stern report described the allegation as unfounded. Its authors said no reliable large-scale study had found ideological motives behind the removal of right-leaning material, or search results weighted against conservative candidates. They cited Facebook engagement rankings in which right-leaning pages often performed strongly.

The question of whether governments can regulate algorithmic curation without infringing platforms' speech rights has been tested in the courts. In Moody v. NetChoice (2024), the Supreme Court considered First Amendment challenges to the Florida and Texas laws. The majority discussed Facebook's News Feed and YouTube's homepage on the record before it. It said that selecting, ordering, labelling and removing third-party posts in those feeds involved protected editorial choices. The Court also said that Texas could not justify altering the feeds merely to change the balance of viewpoints. It nevertheless vacated both appellate judgments and remanded the cases because the lower courts had not assessed the full range of the laws' applications required for facial challenges.

A separate strand of the debate concerns whether reducing an item's algorithmic distribution, rather than removing it, offers a way to limit harm without restricting speech. The disinformation researcher Renée DiResta argued that there is no right to algorithmic amplification and that "free speech is not the same as free reach". She framed reduced distribution, or de-amplification, as distinct from removing content.

Proposed technical alternatives have sought to address some of these concerns. An exploratory analysis in the 2025 audit found that reranking collected tweets by users' stated preferences reduced anger, partisanship and out-group animosity, but could increase exposure to ideologically aligned content.
