= NetChoice v. Weiser =

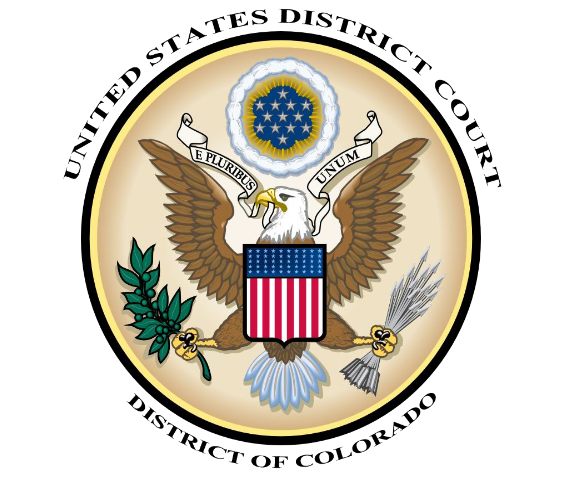
- Court: United States District Court for the District of Colorado
- Full case name: NetChoice v. Phil Weiser in his official capacity as Attorney General of Colorado
- Argued: October 16, 2025
- Decided: November 6, 2025
- Docket nos.: 1:25-cv-02538-WJM-KAS

Court membership
- Judge sitting: William J. Martinez

Keywords
- social media, warning labels, mental health

NetChoice v. Weiser is the lawsuit against HB 23-1136 of Colorado which requires covered social media to display a warning to all users under 18 if they have spent more than an hour on the platform in a 24 hour period of time or are online between 10 pm to 6 am to tell them about the mental health effects that too much social media can have on them. It is the first lawsuit against warning labels for social media.

== Legal History ==
On August 14, 2025, the social media trade association NetChoice sued the Attorney General of Colorado Phil Weiser to stop his enforcement of HB 24-1136 arguing that requiring warning labels on social media is a form of compelled speech. Later on, October 16, 2025, a hearing was held on the Preliminary Injunction by NetChoice motion to block the enforcement of the law.

On November 6, 2025, Federal Senior Judge William J. Martinez granted NetChoice's Preliminary Injunction therefore blocking the state of Colorado from enforcing the law. He determined that the law was a form of compelled speech and triggered strict scrutiny and that it failed that test. This ruling has implications on similar laws that require social media warning labels states such as Minnesota, California and New York.
