= Computer & Communications Industry Association v. Uthmeier =

Lawsuit in Florida

Computer & Communications Industry Association v. Attorney General, State of Florida
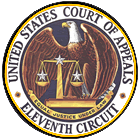
- Court: U.S Court of Appeals for the 11th Circuit
- Full case name: Computer & Communications Industry Association, Appellees v. Attorney General, State of Florida, Appellants
- Argued: March 10, 2026
- Decided: October 14, 2026
- Docket nos.: 25-11881
- Verdict: affirmed in part, reversed in part, vacated and remanded

Case history
- Appealed from: United States District Court for the Northern District of Florida

Ruling
- Florida Statue 501.1736 also known as HB 3 and is subject to intermediate scrutiny and survives that test.

Court membership
- Judges sitting: Kevin Newsom, Robert Luck, and Gerald Bard Tjoflat

Case opinions
- Opinion
- Concurrence: Kevin Newsom

Computer & Communications Industry Association v. Uthmeier is a lawsuit filed by the Computer & Communications Industry Association and NetChoice against Florida law HB 3 which is codified as 501.1736 in the Florida Statues claiming it violates the First Amendment, is unconstitutionally vague, and is preempt by the Children's Online Privacy Protection Act.

The lawsuits name was originally Computer & Communications Industry Association et al. v. Moody until Ashley Moody possession changed from being the Attorney General of Florida to being a Senator and the possession of Attorney General of Florida was given to James Uthmeier.

== Law challenged ==
The law being challenged is HB 3 which is codified as 501.1736 in the Florida Statues. The law requires social media platforms that have at least 10 percent of their users under 16 years old spend on average 2 hours per day, employ algorithms and have addictive features such as infinite scrolling or push notifications. The law then requires these platforms that meet this definition to ban all minors under 14, and they must be removed within 5 business days after request.

Existing account holders who are likely 14 and 15 years old must be removed if they don't have parental consent and will be given 90 days to dispute their termination.

The law is enforced both by a private right of action and by the Department of Legal Affairs which is headed by the Attorney General of Florida and can fine any person or entity in violation of the law with a penalty of 50,000 dollars per violation and issue a subpoena for them to comply with the law and if they don't comply with the subpoena they can be fined 5,000 dollars per week of non-compliance.

== Lawsuit ==
=== U.S District Court for the Northern District of Florida ===
On October 28, 2024, a lawsuit was filed in the U.S District Court for the Northern District of Florida by the Computer & Communications Industry Association and NetChoice claiming the law violates the First Amendment, is unconstitutionally vague, and is preempt by the Children's Online Privacy Protection Act, however largely focuses on the First Amendment claims because the law completely bans anyone under 14 from using any social media platform that meets the criteria in the law.

On November 18, 2024, a schedule was set for the law being that the Attorney General would delay any enforcement of the until the Preliminary Injunction motion was resolved and for the Defendant to reply by January 13, 2025, and for the Plaintiffs to respond by February 14, 2025, and for the Defendant to reply again by February 21, 2025, and a hearing on the motion would be held on either February 27 or 28, 2025 which would later be adjusted to February 28, 2025, for the hearing.

On February 28, 2025, a hearing was held and during the hearing Chief Judge Mark Eaton Walker appeared skeptical of Florida's arguments and said Florida had a hard row to hoe to justify the law, the hearing also lasted for 3 hours.

On March 13, 2025, Chief Judge Mark Eaton Walker would deny Plaintiffs motion for a Preliminary Injunction claiming they had failed to show that at least one of its members had at least 10 percent of its users under 16 spent at least 2 hours per day on their platform. He would also grant defendants motion to dismiss 4 days later and asked Plaintiffs to file an amended complaint by March 31, 2025. Plaintiffs Computer & Communications Industry Association and NetChoice would later do just that claiming this time they had evidence that Snapchat was covered by the law and that YouTube, Instagram and Facebook were likely covered by the law.

Later on, June 3, 2025, Chief Judge Mark E. Walker granted the renewed Preliminary Injunction because the law failed first amendment Intermediate scrutiny.

=== U.S Court of Appeals for the 11th Circuit ===
The same day that Chief Judge Walker granted the Preliminary Injunction Florida appealed to the U.S Court of Appeals for the 11th Circuit. Florida has since asked the 11th Circuit Court to stay the District Courts Injunction which is still pending.

On November 25, 2025, the U.S Court of Appeals for the 11th Circuit granted Florida's motion to stay the preliminary injunction by a 2-1 vote meaning the law went into effect.

On March 10, 2026, a hearing was heard and on October 14, 2026, the appeals court ruled unanimously 3-0 that the law was constitutional and survived intermediate scrutiny under the First Amendment. The opinion was written by Judge Kevin Newsom and joined by Robert Luck and Gerald Bard Tjoflat. Judge Kevin Newsom also wrote a concurring opinion for the case.

== See also ==
- Computer & Communications Industry Association v. Paxton, similar lawsuit in Texas
