= SB 868 (Florida) =

Social Media Use by Minors

Florida Legislature
- Long title: Social Media Use by Minors; Requiring social media platforms to provide a mechanism to decrypt end-to-end encryption when law enforcement obtains a warrant or subpoena; requiring social media platforms to allow a parent or legal guardian of a minor account holder to view all messages; prohibiting minor account holders from using or accessing messages that are designed to disappear or self destruct, or are ephemeral in nature, etc.
- Citation: 501.1736
- Territorial extent: State of Florida

Legislative history
- Introduced: February 19, 2025
- Passed: April 24, 2025
- Voting summary: 34 Florida Senators voted for; 3 Florida Senators voted against
- Status: Pending

SB 868 is a Bill in the Florida legislature, which is an amendment to Florida Statutes 501.1736 or "HB 3" a law that is already being challenged in federal court on First Amendment Grounds in the cause Computer & Communications Industry Association v. Uthmeier. What the amendment does to Florida HB 3 is allow Florida Law Enforcement to get a warrant or subpoena to decrypt messages from a minor in an investigation and allow parents of a minor to view their messages on a platform that meets the criteria in HB 3. The bill passed the Florida Senate by a vote of 34-3. The bill has been criticized for weakening encryption by the Electronic Frontier Foundation.
