= SAFE For Kids Act =

New York law

The New York State Assembly
- Long title: AN ACT to amend the general business law, in relation to enacting the Stop Addictive Feeds Exploitation (SAFE) for Kids act prohibiting the provision of an addictive feed to a minor
- Territorial extent: State of New York
- Signed: June 20, 2024
- Introduced: October 13, 2023
- Status: Not yet in force

The SAFE For Kids Act, also known as Stop Addictive Feed Exploration for Kids Act or S7694A, is an American law in the state of New York that requires parental consent for anyone under 18 as well as estimation of their age to have an "addictive" feed. It was later signed on June 20, 2024, by New Yorks Governor and goes into effect 180 days after being signed.

== Progression ==
The bill had zero votes against it in its rule committee vote or its floor vote and was promoted by the governor.

== Summary ==
The bill requires addictive social media platforms which is defined as any website, online service, online application, or mobile application, that offers or provides users an addictive feed as a significant part of the services provided by such website, online service, online application, or mobile application. These platforms will have to use a method to determine someone's age and if they are under 18 years of age to get parental consent before giving them an "addictive" feed. It also prohibits these platforms from sending notifications to anyone under 18 between 12:00 am - 6:00 am Eastern Standard Time without parental consent. The rulemaking authority and enforcement is done by the Attorney General of New York and it will take effect and be enforced within 180 days of it being signed. Noncompliance with the law will incur a $5,000 fine per violation.

== Promotion ==
Aside from the Governor of New York the bill has been promoted by Common Sense Media.

== Criticism ==
The bill has been criticized by the Electronic Frontier Foundation and NetChoice because the law requires age verification, which they assert strips away privacy and chills free speech. However, neither of them has yet sued New York over the law yet.

== Similar legislation ==
A similar law SB 976 also known as the Protecting Our Kids from Social Media Addiction Act was passed in California and goes into effect January 1, 2027, and a similar bill SB 359 which passed the Virginia Senate by a vote of 40-0 during its 2024 session has been carried over to its 2025 session.
