= HB 24-1136 (Colorado) =

Healthier Social Media Use by Youth

Colorado Legislature
- Long title: HB 24-1136
- Citation: §6-1-1601
- Territorial extent: State of Colorado
- Enacted by: Colorado House of Representatives
- Enacted: Colorado Senate
- Signed by: June 6, 2024
- Effective: January 1, 2026

Legislative history
- Introduced: January 29, 2024
- Third reading: March 11, 2024
- Voting summary: 54 voted for; 7 voted against; 4 abstained
- Passed: March 11, 2024
- Third reading: April 18, 2024
- Voting summary: 58 voted for; 2 voted against; 5 abstained
- Status: Pending

HB 24-1136, also known as Healthier Social Media Use by Youth, is a Colorado state law that requires social media platforms to display a warning to users under 18 years of age telling them about impact excessive amounts of usage can have on younger users. This warning will show up on the under 18 account every 30 minutes if they have used the platform for longer an hour in a 24-hour period of time or are on the platform between 10 pm to 6 am. The law also requires the Colorado Department of Education to have a resource bank of studies and research on internet safety to be used by primary and secondary schools within the state. The law is enforced by the Colorado Attorney General, who can impose fines of up to $20,000 per violation.

Colorado is the first state to pass a law requiring warning labels for social media usage. Minnesota and New York have since passed similar laws.

== Lawsuit ==
On August 14, 2025, the trade association NetChoice sued attorney general Phil Weiser in the U.S District Court for the District of Colorado, arguing that the law compels the speech of its members. NetChoice launched the case on the same day as the U.S. Supreme Court denied a request to block another social media law in Mississippi known as HB 1126.
