= Social Media Parental Notification Act =

Government of Ohio
- Long title: Parental Notification by Social Media Operators Act
- Citation: Ohio Rev. Code § 1349.09
- Territorial extent: Ohio
- Enacted by: Government of Ohio
- Effective: June 18, 2026
- Passed: June 12, 2023

Summary
- Stops minors under the age of 16 from signing up to social media without parental consent
- Status: In force

The Social Media Parental Notification Act was a bill implemented by Ohio's governor that would have required online companies to obtain parental consent in order for a minor under the age of 16 to use their platform.

== History ==
The bill was passed on June 12, 2023, by the Ohio congress. Lieutenant governor Jon Husted advocated for the law due to his belief that social media is "designed to be addictive and is harming the mental health of children."

=== Controversies ===
NetChoice, LLC v. Yost
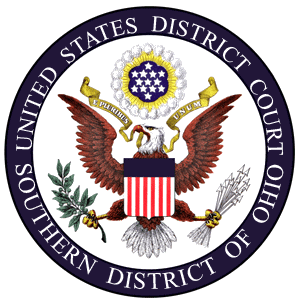
- Court: Southern District of Ohio
- Full case name: NetChoice, LLC v. Dave Yost
- Started: January 5, 2024; 2 years ago
- Docket nos.: 2:24-cv-00047 (S.D. Ohio); 25-3371 (6th Cir.)

Case history
- Appealed to: United States Court of Appeals for the Sixth Circuit

Court membership
- Judge sitting: Algenon L. Marbley

Keywords
- First Amendment; Void for vagueness

Many critics of the bill saw it as a way to stop minors using the platforms for educational reasons and political activism and to limit free speech of minors and violate the privacy of users. On January 9, 2024, the Ohio court blocked the bill from going into effect calling for a temporary restraining order on it, this was after NetChoice sued the Attorney General of Ohio saying the bill violated the first amendment, fourteenth amendment, and United States federal law. On February 12, 2024, Judge Algenon L. Marbley granted NetChoice a preliminary injunction preventing the act from becoming law. It's been completely blocked by the Judge Algenon L. Marbley stating that the need for parental permission was an undue burden on the rights of platform users.

On April 16, 2025, the law was permanently enjoined. On June 18, 2026, the Court of Appeals for the Sixth Circuit reversed Marbley's judgment.

== See also ==
- Children's Online Privacy Protection Act
- Youth rights
- Kids Online Safety Act
- Adultism
- NetChoice
