= Texas SB 2420 (2025) =

Senate Bill 2420

Texas Legislature
- Long title: AN ACT relating to the regulation of platforms for the sale and distribution of software applications for mobile devices.
- Territorial extent: Texas
- Enacted by: Texas Senate
- Enacted by: Texas House of Representatives
- Effective: May 28, 2026 (Due to court order)

Legislative history

Initiating chamber: Texas Senate
- Introduced: March 13, 2025
- First reading: March 25, 2025
- Second reading: April 16, 2025
- Third reading: April 16, 2025
- Voting summary: 30 voted for; 1 voted against

Revising chamber: Texas House of Representatives
- Received from the Texas Senate: April 17, 2025
- First reading: April 22, 2025
- Second reading: May 8, 2025
- Third reading: May 9, 2025
- Voting summary: 120 voted for; 9 voted against; 3 present not voting

Final stages
- Finally passed both chambers: May 14, 2025
- Status: In force

SB 2420 is a Texas law that requires appstores and app developers to verify the age of users. Users under the age of 18 must have parental consent to download apps or complete in-app purchases.

== Bill summary ==
The Texas law requires appstores to verify the user's age category; the age categories are as follows: child (under 13), young teenager (13–15), older teenager (16–17), and adult. Once an appstore has verified the age category of a user, those under 18 must have verified parental consent before they can download apps or complete in app purchases. Appstores must put an age rating on apps and display their content. App developers must be able to have the verification status of age and parental consent.

== Bill passages ==
SB 2420 had very little opposition when passing though both the Texas Senate and Texas House of Representatives. The only Texas Senator to vote no was Sarah Eckhardt, and only nine voted against it in the Texas House of Representatives.

== Legal challenges ==
In October 2025 both the trade association Computer & Communications Industry Association (CCIA) and the Texas student advocacy group Students Engaged in Advancing Texas (SEAT) sued the attorney general of Texas, Ken Paxton, to block the law before it takes effect on January 1, 2026.

On December 23, 2025, the law was blocked from taking effect.
