= Swimply =

Online platform for pool rentals

- Website type: Private
- Headquarters: Los Angeles
- Area served: United States; Canada; Australia
- Key people: Bunim Laskin (Founder); Derek Callow (CEO)
- Industry: Online marketplace
- Services: Short-term rental; Recreation & Leisure
- Website: swimply.com
- Launched: June 2019; 7 years ago

Swimply is an online marketplace for renting private swimming pools, sport courts, and houses by the hour. The platform operates as a peer-to-peer service enabling property owners to monetize underutilized backyard spaces while providing renters access to private pools. Reservations are made via the Swimply mobile app for Android or iPhone or via the company's website. Communication with guests, selection of amenities, and payment are all handled through the Swimply platform. Swimply currently operates in the United States, Canada, and Australia.

Often described as the "Airbnb for pools," Swimply has expanded beyond pool rental services to include hot tubs, pickleball courts, tennis courts, basketball courts, backyards, and full home rentals by the hour.

== History ==
Founder Bunim Laskin came up with the idea for the app at the age of 20, after noticing a neighbor's pool which was rarely in use. He rented their pool in exchange for assistance paying for the pool's upkeep. He then realized that he might have a scalable business plan and began finding other neighbor's pools using Google Earth's satellite photos. Launching as Swimply (swimming and simply), he soon had over 30 pools listed, 400 reservations and was featured on MSNBC. By the end of the year he dropped out of college to pursue the business full-time.

In November 2019, Swimply expanded to Australia.

Laskin appeared on a 13 March 2020 episode of Shark Tank pitching an investment opportunity in his company. All Sharks declined.

== Funding and revenue ==
Laskin received $30,000 from family and friends, followed by $1,200,000 in an initial seed round. Another round of funding fell through due to the COVID-19 pandemic, but the company did see a 4000% increase in revenue during 2020. In 2021, Swimply closed a $10 million Series A round in 2021 led by Norwest Venture Partners. In 2022, Swimply raised $40 million in a funding round led by Mayfield.

The round was followed on by Trust Ventures and other notable angels, including Poshmark CEO Manish Chandra and Ancestry.com CEO Debora Liu.

Swimply follows a similar pricing model to Airbnb, where commission fees are incurred both on the host and guest side. Hourly rentals start at $20 per hour in most markets

== Business model ==
Swimply operates as a two-sided marketplace connecting property owners ("hosts") with individuals seeking short-term access to recreational amenities ("guests"). Hosts list their pools and other amenities, including descriptions, photographs, and hourly rates they set. Guests can search for available listings, filter by location and amenities, and book reservations through the Swimply mobile application or website.

The platform generates revenue through commission fees on both sides of transactions: a 20% fee charged to hosts and a 10% service fee charged to guests. Hourly rates for pool rentals typically range from $25 to over $100, with an average of approximately $45 per hour. The average reservation lasts two hours and accommodates five to eight guests.

== Services ==
While the company initially focused exclusively on pool sharing, Swimply has expanded to include additional recreational spaces. In 2022, the company began listing sports courts including tennis, basketball, and pickleball facilities. The platform also offers hot tub rentals, backyards for events, and full home rentals by the hour.

As of 2025, Swimply reports over 15,000 hosts across more than 150 cities and claims to have facilitated over 4 million experiences since its founding.

== Liability ==
As of 2023, Swimply no longer provides a liability insurance policy. Swimply cancelled their insurance and replaced it with a "host guarantee" of $1 million that is self-funded and $10,000 of property protection for hosts inside the United States. Swimply requires pool owners to have their pools inspected for health and safety including inspection of tiles and chlorine levels.

== Regulatory ==
Swimply has faced regulatory challenges in multiple jurisdictions regarding whether private pools offered for rent should be classified as public pools subject to commercial licensing and safety requirements.

In 2021, the Wisconsin Department of Agriculture, Trade and Consumer Protection initially indicated that pools rented through Swimply would be subject to public pool regulations. After Swimply, represented by the Wisconsin Institute for Law & Liberty, threatened litigation, the agency clarified that most pools offered on the platform would not be subject to commercial pool licensing requirements.

In Minnesota, the Department of Health issued guidance in 2021 classifying pools rented on Swimply as public pools. In November 2024, Swimply and several Minnesota pool owners filed a petition challenging this classification as an improperly promulgated rule. In March 2025, an administrative law judge dismissed the petition, finding the Department's interpretation consistent with state law.
