= Texas House Bill 20 =

U.S. state anti-deplatforming law

Texas Legislature
- Long title: An Act Relating to censorship of or certain other interference with digital expression, including expression on social media platforms or through electronic mail messages.
- Territorial extent: Texas
- Passed by: Texas Legislature
- Passed: September 9, 2021

Legislative history
- Bill title: Texas House Bill 20
- Introduced by: Bryan Hughes, Briscoe Cain
- First reading: August 19, 2021
- Second reading: August 27, 2021
- Third reading: August 31, 2021

Keywords
- censorship, Social media, electronic mail, common carrier
- Status: Pending

An Act Relating to censorship of or certain other interference with digital expression, including expression on social media platforms or through electronic mail messages, also known as Texas House Bill 20 (HB20), is a Texas anti-deplatforming law enacted on September 9, 2021.

It prohibits large social media platforms from removing, moderating, or labeling posts made by users in the state of Texas based on their "viewpoints", unless considered illegal under federal law or otherwise falling into exempted categories. It also requires them to make various public disclosures relating to their business practices (including the impact of algorithmic and moderation decisions on the content that is delivered to users).

The bill is part of a wider array of Republican-backed legislation seeking to prohibit the censorship of political speech, based on allegations that the moderation policies of large social media platforms are not politically neutral.

It has been challenged in NetChoice, LLC v. Paxton, and is currently the subject of a circuit split between the Fifth Circuit, and a decision by the Eleventh Circuit that struck down a similar bill in the state of Florida. In September 2023, the U.S. Supreme Court agreed to hear NetChoice v. Paxton jointly with NetChoice v. Moody on questions of whether the Florida and Texas state laws are in compliance with the 1st Amendment.

== Content ==
The law applies to "social media platforms" that serve users in the state of Texas, and have more than 50 million monthly active users in the United States. They are defined as any public internet website or application that allows users to "communicate with other users for the primary purpose of posting information, comments, messages, or images", excluding internet service providers, electronic mail, and services where communication features are "incidental to, directly related to, or dependent on" content that is pre-selected by the operator. In the bill, to "censor" is defined as to "block, ban, remove, deplatform, demonetize, de-boost, restrict, deny equal access or visibility to, or otherwise discriminate against" expression.

The law prohibits social media platforms from "censoring on the basis of user viewpoint, user expression, or the ability of a user to receive the expression of others", or on the basis of a user's geographic location in Texas. This includes removal or labeling posts with warnings and disclaimers. Social media platforms may only censor content if it is unlawful, they are "specifically authorized" to do so by federal law, based on requests from "an organization with the purpose of preventing the sexual exploitation of children or protecting survivors of sexual abuse from ongoing harassment", or "directly incites" criminal activity or contains threats of violence against persons based on protected categories. It is disputed over whether this provision is actually enforceable, as it may be preempted by Section 230 of the Communications Decency Act (which states that the operators of interactive computer services are not responsible for the actions of their users).

Social media platforms must make public disclosures regarding the algorithmic techniques and moderation polices that are used to determine the content provided to users, must publish a compliant acceptable use policy (AUP), and must publish a biannual transparency report containing specific details on all actions made by the service regarding the moderation of users and content.

The law also prohibits email providers from "intentionally imped[ing] the transmission of another person's electronic mail message based on the content."

== Legislative history ==
Texas Governor Greg Abbott signed the bill into law on September 9, 2021. Democrat-proposed amendments excluding Holocaust denial, terrorism content, and vaccine misinformation from the bill were rejected.

Following a suit by the industry groups Computer & Communications Industry Association (CCIA) and NetChoice, NetChoice, LLC v. Paxton, the bill was blocked by U.S. District Judge Robert Pitman in December 2021, on First Amendment grounds. Texas appealed to the United States Court of Appeals for the Fifth Circuit. Judges Edith Jones, Andrew Oldham, and Leslie H. Southwick, lifted the injunction on May 11, 2022, but the decision was appealed to the Supreme Court which suspended the bill pending a full review in the Fifth Circuit.

On September 16, 2022, the Fifth Circuit reversed the injunction, allowing the bill to take effect; Judge Oldham stated that the bill "chills censorship" and "does not chill speech", and accused the plaintiffs of "attempt[ing] to extract a freewheeling censorship right from the Constitution's free speech guarantee. The Platforms are not newspapers. Their censorship is not speech." Southwick dissented, stating that "we are in a new arena, a very extensive one, for speakers and for those who would moderate their speech. None of the precedents fit seamlessly." The CCIA and NetChoice requested a stay on the ruling and that the case be taken to the Supreme Court, arguing that the reversal conflicts with an Eleventh Circuit decision in NetChoice v. Moody which struck down a similar anti-moderation bill imposed by the state of Florida. On October 12, 2022, the Fifth Circuit granted the stay.
