= Computer & Communications Industry Association =

IT industry advocacy organization

Computer and Communications Industry Association
- Formation: 1972; 54 years ago
- Purpose: Lobbying
- Members: internet services, software and telecom companies
- President & CEO: Matthew Schruers
- Subsidiaries: CCIA Europe
- Website: Official website

The Computer and Communications Industry Association (CCIA) is an international non-profit advocacy organization based in Washington, DC, United States which represents the information and communications technology industries. According to their site, CCIA "promotes open markets, open systems, open networks, and full, fair, and open competition." Established in 1972, CCIA was active in antitrust cases involving IBM, AT&T and Microsoft, and lobbied for net neutrality, copyright and patent reform and against internet censorship and policies, mergers or other situations that would reduce competition. CCIA released a study it commissioned by an MIT professor, which analyzed the cost of patent trolls to the economy, a study on the economic benefits of Fair Use, and has testified before the Senate on limiting government surveillance and on internet censorship as a trade issue.

== Membership ==
CCIA's membership comprises a range of global technology companies. As of December 2025, the organisation lists its members on its official website. Notable brand updates include: Amazon, Apple Inc., BT Group, Cloudflare, Dish Network, eBay, Facebook's rebranding as Meta, Google, Intel, Intuit, Mozilla, NordVPN, Rakuten, Red Hat, Samsung, Twitter, Uber, and Yahoo! and Twitter's 2023 rebranding as X under the leadership of Elon Musk.

== Issues ==
=== Internet freedom ===
The group has lobbied in favor of Internet freedom on issues like the Stop Online Piracy Act and PROTECT IP Act, testified on Internet censorship as a human rights and trade issue, and also lobbied on privacy issues including government surveillance by the US National Security Agency CCIA has also lobbied for net neutrality, filing comments with the FCC and amicus briefs in court so that no company or government could discriminate against similar content. CCIA has lobbied to ensure patent litigation reform, including the Innovation Act, and provides the website Patent Progress, which is dedicated to patent issues. CCIA supported Section 230 when it passed in 1996 as it facilitated free speech online by giving companies some level of liability protection for both allowing the free speech and also removing some legal speech such as "hate speech" that may violate user agreements. Since then, CCIA has warned against altering Section 230 as some in Congress sought to pressure social media companies with changes to the law.

=== Intellectual property ===
CCIA represents companies that hold patents and also rely on licensing patents from others to produce interoperable tech products. CCIA supports balanced intellectual property policies that support both patent holders and next generation innovation. It maintains a blog, Patent Progress, that covers issues like patent reform. CCIA filed an amicus brief in the Apple Samsung design patent case, which the court ultimately used in its ruling. The Supreme Court ended up agreeing a company should not gain another company's entire profits on a product over a design patent infringement issue. CCIA has been fighting for comprehensive patent reform for two decades and has issued statements supporting venue reform, as a fifth of the patent cases are ushered over to the Eastern District of Texas, which promotes itself as having procedures and juries that favor patent owners.

CCIA supports balancing copyright policy so that it incentivizes creators and also allows people to access information online. It has commissioned studies in the US and Europe that industries that rely on fair use and other copyright exceptions make up one-sixth of the GDP. The tech trade association has warned about court rulings such as Europe's right to be forgotten, which creates the ability for any EU citizen to "disappear" on web search results. In a New York Times article, which also ran on CNBC, CCIA Vice President James Waterworth said, "This ruling opens the door to large-scale private censorship in Europe. While the ruling likely means to offer protections, our concern is it could also be misused by politicians or others with something to hide."

=== Privacy ===
CCIA has also been an outspoken critic of government surveillance without checks and balances. CCIA CEO Ed Black testified against FISA renewal before the Senate in 2007, saying better checks and balances were needed, and he testified again in 2013 after the Snowden revelations about the scope of NSA surveillance. In a Washington Diplomat article looking at the impact of the leaks one year later, Black expressed optimism that people will be better able to protect themselves in the future and he has called on Congress to pass legislation to allow companies to disclose the size and scope of government requests and for the government to end mass bulk data collection.

=== CCIA Europe ===
Established in 2010, CCIA's four-person Brussels office advocates for its members on various issues with European regulators. These include copyright reform, the audiovisual services directive, e-Privacy, telecommunications, data transfers, and trade. As Europe transitions to a Digital Single Market, there's a chance to implement policies that enhance its innovation economy and support traditional industries increasingly dependent on the internet for collaboration and customer engagement.

In June 2025, CCIA Europe urged European Union policymakers to delay implementation of certain provisions of the Artificial Intelligence Act, citing the need for clearer regulatory guidance on obligations for general-purpose AI systems and the associated compliance timelines.

=== Amazon Prime ===
CCIA is currently lobbying against antitrust bills in the United States that threaten to break up Amazon Prime and other big technology corporations. CCIA President Matt Schruers has stated: “At a time when the public faces rising prices on necessities, they can shop online for competitive offers a few clicks away, often on free services with free shipping. Smart antitrust policy happens when regulators focus on consumer harm, rather than targeting innovative sectors where customers are satisfied. The FTC’s case would result in fewer products to choose from, higher prices for consumers, and reduced options.” The CCIA has also commissioned reports that criticize the American Innovation and Choice Online Act and other measures that would increase antitrust enforcement, particularly against tech firms.

== Trade policy and digital taxation ==
In June 2025, the Government of Canada announced it would withdraw its proposed Digital Services Tax as part of renewed trade discussions with the United States. CCIA welcomed the decision, linking it to the association's longstanding advocacy for the removal of digital trade barriers.

== Litigation ==
=== Moody v. NetChoice and NetChoice v. Paxton ===
In the early 2020s, the CCIA, together with the trade association NetChoice, initiated a series of legal challenges to state laws regulating content moderation on social media platforms. In Florida, the associations contested Senate Bill 7072, which restricted large platforms' ability to suspend political candidates and required disclosure of moderation practices. In Texas, they challenged House Bill 20, which prohibited platforms from removing or demoting content on the basis of viewpoint. The two cases, Moody v. NetChoice and NetChoice v. Paxton, reached the Supreme Court of the United States.

On 1 July 2024, the Court vacated and remanded both cases for further proceedings, holding that the lower courts had not sufficiently analyzed the First Amendment implications of the statutes. The decision left the laws unenforced while further constitutional review proceeds in the courts of appeals.

=== Florida House Bill 3 ===
In October 2024, the CCIA and NetChoice filed a suit against Florida House Bill 3, a statute that restricted social media use by minors. The law prohibited children under the age of fourteen from maintaining accounts on social media platforms and required parental consent for users aged fourteen and fifteen. On 3 June 2025, a federal district judge issued a preliminary injunction blocking enforcement of the age-based account restrictions, holding that they likely violated the First Amendment. Provisions requiring platforms to allow parents or guardians to delete their children's accounts were permitted to take effect while litigation continued.

=== Texas Senate Bill 2420 ===
On 16 October 2025 the CCIA sued the state of Texas alongside a student advocacy group known as Students Engaged in Advancing Texas (SEAT) over SB 2420 a law that requires Appstore's to verify the age of all users and require parental consent for every download and in app purchase that was done by a minor under eighteen. On 23 December 2025 the law was enjoined from being enforced Judge Robert Pitman compared the law to as if Texas required every person to verify their age in a bookstore and obtain parental consent for minors before they enter or purchase a book, Texas has since appealed this ruling.

=== Amicus participation ===
Beyond direct party litigation, the CCIA has also taken part in cases as amicus curiae. In September 2025, the association, alongside NetChoice and other trade groups, filed an amicus brief in Washington v. Meta, a case before the Washington Supreme Court concerning state disclosure requirements for political advertising. The amici urged the court to overturn a fine of US$35 million imposed on Meta under Washington's campaign-finance laws.

== See also ==
- American Edge
- Chamber of Progress
