= NetChoice =

US trade association

- Formation: March 16, 2001; 25 years ago
- Type: 501(c)(6)
- Tax ID no.: EIN: 271716101
- Purpose: Trade association "to make the Internet safe for free enterprise and free expression"
- Headquarters: Washington, D.C.
- Revenue: 22,621,094 USD (2024)
- Expenses: 21,488,246 USD (2024)
- Website: netchoice.org

NetChoice is a trade association of online businesses that advocates for free expression and free enterprise on the internet. It currently has six active First Amendment lawsuits over state-level internet regulations, including NetChoice v. Paxton, Moody v. NetChoice, NetChoice v. Bonta and NetChoice v. Yost, NetChoice v, Weiser.

They have also challenged multiple social media age verification laws in the United States.

== Membership ==
As of January 2026, NetChoice's members include:

- Airbnb
- Amazon
- Automattic
- Discord
- Dreamwidth
- Duolingo
- EarnIn
- eBay
- Etsy
- Expedia
- Google
- Hims&Hers
- HomeAway
- Hotels.com
- JP Morgan Chase
- Lyft
- Meta
- Netflix
- Nextdoor
- OfferUp
- OpenAI
- Orbitz
- PayPal
- Pindrop Security
- Pinterest
- PrizePicks
- Reddit
- Snap
- StubHub
- Swimply
- Travel Tech Association
- Travelocity
- Trivago
- Turo
- X
- Vrbo
- Waymo
- Wing

TikTok joined the group in 2019, and departed in early May 2024, with two people telling Politico that House Majority Leader Steve Scalise's office pressured NetChoice to remove TikTok from the roster. NetChoice had previously defended TikTok from state-level legislation to ban the app, even up to right before it was removed.

== Lawsuits ==
=== Moody v. NetChoice ===
In May 2021, Florida passed SB 7072, a bill to ban social media companies from "deplatforming" users who are political candidates or "journalistic enterprises," among other things. The bill contained an exemption for companies that operated a theme park or entertainment complex in Florida. This exemption was removed later after DeSantis objected to The Walt Disney Company's challenge to the Florida Parental Rights in Education Act, also known as the "Don't Say Gay" law.

NetChoice and the Computer & Communications Industry Association (CCIA) challenged the law shortly after it was passed. Judge Robert Hinkle of the United States District Court for the Northern District of Florida granted a preliminary injunction on most of SB 7072 in June 2021, finding that "balancing the exchange of ideas among private speakers is not a legitimate governmental interest" and that social media companies' content moderation is First Amendment-protected editorial discretion. The Eleventh Circuit upheld most of the district court's injunction in May 2022. In September 2023, the Supreme Court granted certiorari of Moody and its companion case, NetChoice v. Paxton. The cases were heard together on February 26, 2024.

=== NetChoice v. Paxton ===
In September 2021, Texas passed House Bill 20, a measure to ban popular social media services from moderating content based on "viewpoint" and from adding addenda, like fact-checks, to their users’ posts, among other things.

NetChoice and CCIA sued Ken Paxton, the Attorney General of Texas, in federal court to block the law's implementation. On December 1, 2021, the federal district court granted a preliminary injunction enjoining the law's enforcement. The court ruled that HB 20 was unconstitutional because content moderation is First Amendment-protected editorial discretion. Texas appealed the district court's decision to grant an injunction, and in May 2022, a panel of the Fifth Circuit Court of Appeals issued a one-sentence order for Texas, allowing the law to take effect.

Two days later, NetChoice and CCIA petitioned the Supreme Court to vacate the stay and reinstate the district court's injunction. They argued that the Fifth Circuit's unreasoned order deprived them of "careful review and a meaningful decision" and that reinstating the district court's stay would preserve the status quo while the law's constitutionality continued to be litigated. On May 31, 2022, the Supreme Court agreed, vacating the Fifth Circuit's stay by a 5–4 vote to allow the injunction to take effect once more. Justices Alito, Thomas, and Gorsuch dissented. Justice Kagan voted to deny the stay as well, but did not write to explain her decision.

On September 16, 2022, a panel of the Fifth Circuit ruled that the district court erred in issuing its injunction, saying that the First Amendment does not protect social media companies' editorial discretion over what user generated content to publish. The Fifth Circuit's ruling created a circuit split with the Eleventh Circuit which, in May 2022, largely upheld an injunction against a similar law in NetChoice v. Moody.

In September 2023, the Supreme Court granted certiorari of Paxton and NetChoice v. Moody. The cases were heard together on February 26, 2024.

=== NetChoice v. Griffin ===
On April 11, 2023 Arkansas Governor Sarah Huckabee Sanders signed SB 369 also known as The Social Media Safety Act which became Act 689 after being signed. The law required some social media companies if they made more than 100 million dollars per year to verify the age of new accounts and if they were under 18 get parental consent. NetChoice sent a veto request to the governor before signing it. After this on June 29, 2023, NetChoice filed a lawsuit against the law. Both the American Civil Liberties Union and Electronic Frontier Foundation filed briefs for the case. The law would later be enjoined by Judge Timothy L Brooks on August 31, 2023. The Judges reasoning was that it likely violated the First Amendment and was too broad to enforce and would cause harm to NetChoice's Members.

=== NetChoice v. Yost ===
On July 5, 2023, Ohio governor Mike DeWine signed HB 33 into law which included the Social Media Parental Notification Act as a part of the Ohio 2024 to 2025 fiscal year budget. This law requires that children and teens under 16 to get parental consent on a platform that allows content to be posted a on a public or semi-public profile. The law was originally set to go into effect on January 15, 2024, ten days before the law was set to go in effect. NetChoice filed a lawsuit against the State of Ohio claiming that the law was violating constitutional rights and the First Amendment and that it would pose a risk to internet privacy, safety and security. On January 8, 2024, an Ohio judge granted a temporary restraining order that stopped the law from going into effect on January 15. The judge stated that "Foreclosing minors under sixteen from accessing all content on websites that the Act purports to cover, absent affirmative parental consent, is a breathtakingly blunt instrument for reducing social media’s harm to children.” A hearing was held on February 7. The law remained suspended.

=== NetChoice v. Fitch ===
On April 30, 2024, Mississippi Governor Tate Reeves signed HB 1126 also known as The Walker Montgomery Protecting Children Online Act. NetChoice would later on June 7, 2024, file a lawsuit against Lynn Fitch to The District Court for the Southern District of Mississippi. The Electronic Frontier Foundation would file a brief during the case in the district court supporting NetChoice on June 18 of the same year. The Law was later enjoined on July 1, 2024, by Judge Halil Suleyman Ozerden however said he didn't doubt the good intentions of the law but that the law was still likely unconstitutional. 4 days after the law was blocked the case was appealed to The Fifth Circuit Court of Appeals.

=== NetChoice v. Reyes ===
On March 23, 2023, Utah Governor Spencer Cox signed SB 152 and HB 311, collectively known as Utah Social Media Regulation Act. The bills were criticized by the Electronic Frontier Foundation for violating the privacy and rights of older minors. On December 18, 2023, NetChoice filed a complaint against the laws to The District Court of Utah. The laws would later be amended in March 2024 by SB 194 and HB 464; the new laws modified the parental consent and age verification parts of the original law ones signed in March 2023. However, NetChoice on May 3, 2024, filed an updated complaint against the amended laws. The case was partially dismissed on July 22, 2024, on Section 230 grounds. Later on September 10, 2024, Judge Robert J Shelby granted an injunction against the law blocking the law from being enforced. Later on October 11, 2024, the case would be appealed to the 10th Circuit.

=== CCIA & NetChoice v. Paxton II ===
On June 13, 2023, Texas Governor Greg Abbott signed HB 18 also known as The SCOPE Act. The law requires platforms if a user has an account that is registered as being under 18 years of age to get verified consent from a parent or guardian before they can have an account. It also requires platforms to filter and block content if it promotes, glorifies, or facilitates such topics such as suicide, self-harm, or eating disorders, substance abuse, stalking, bullying, or harassment, or grooming, etc. Later on July 30, 2024, both the Computer and Communications Industry Association and NetChoice sued Attorney General Ken Paxton to block the law before it went into effect in September. On August 30, 2024, Judge Robert Pitman blocked the content blocking and filtering requirements of the law because they likely violated the first amendment. However let the rest of the law to go into effect because the plaintiffs didn't show that the rest of the law was unconstitutional.

=== Netchoice v. Skrmetti ===
On May 2, 2024 Governor Bill Lee signed the Protecting Kids From Social Media Act (HB 1891). The bill requires social media platform verify the age of users and if the user is under 18 years of age to get parental consent. Netchoice would file a complaint on October 3, 2024, in federal court. The case is still ongoing. The judge for the case is William L Campbell Jr

=== CCIA & NetChoice v. Moody II ===
On January 5, 2024 Florida House Member Tylor Sirois introduced HB 1, which would ban anyone under 16 years of age from any social media platform, even with parental consent, and would make platforms verify the age of users to make sure they are not under 16. After the bill passed the Florida State House by a vote of 106–13, the American Civil Liberties Union would make an article in opposition to the bill, saying that it would violate the first amendment rights of minors and adults, as well as undermine parental rights. Soon after the bill passed the Florida State Senate by a vote of 23–14, NetChoice sent a letter to Governor of Florida Ron DeSantis to veto HB 1.

Ron DeSantis vetoed HB 1 on March 1, 2024, his reasoning being that the state legislature was going to enact a "superior" bill that was going to uphold parental rights and allow adults to speak anonymously online. If HB 1 had been signed, it would have gone into effect in July 2024. The "superior" bill was HB 3, which decreased the minimum age of HB 1 from 16 to 14 and would allow minors aged 14 and 15 to make social media accounts with parental consent. It also removed the mandatory age verification that was in HB 1 and delayed the effective date from July 2024 to January 2025.

After HB 3 was sent to The Governor of Florida, PEN America along with the Chamber of Progress, PRISM, The Trevor Project, The First Amendment Foundation, LGBT Tech, American Civil Liberties Union, and NetChoice sent a letter against him to veto it, arguing that it was unconstitutional. Ron DeSantis signed HB 3 into law on March 25, 2024.

On October 28, 2024, the Computer and Communications Industry Association along with NetChoice would file a lawsuit against the Attorney General of Florida to The Northern District Court of Florida to block the law before it takes effect on January 1, 2025.

=== NetChoice v. Bonta II ===
On November 12, 2024, Netchoice sued the attorney general of California again over the new state law SB 976 which restricts some design features and personalized algorithms without parental consent for minors under 18 and require covered platforms disclose how many minors are having restrictions on them. NetChoice make claims that the law violated the First Amendment of the United States Constitution. On December 31, 2024, the Judge for the case in the District Court only blocked the provisions for disclosing how many minors are following the restrictions and only one of the restrictions that being the one that blocked notifications for minors during school and nighttime hours. Netchoice would appeal this ruling, and the law would be enjoined pending appeal, but would be lifted in part when the Ninth Circuit Court of Appeals found most of the law constitutional in September 2025 and affirmed the districts courts denial of an injunction except as to the restrictions on minors being able to view the like count. NetChoice has since asked for a rehearing.

== Controversy ==
In April 2024, The Intercept revealed that NetChoice had made donations in excess of $800,000 to organizations that went on to file amicus briefs in support of its arguments in multiple lawsuits, including a $450,000 contribution in 2022 to TechFreedom, a nonprofit think tank that later filed an amicus brief in support of NetChoice's argument in NetChoice v. Paxton.

In January 2025, NetChoice and TechNet sued the U.S. Consumer Financial Protection Bureau to block a new rule which gave the regulator supervisory authority over payment apps and digital wallets from large non-banks.
