= Protecting Our Kids from Social Media Addiction Act =

Law to address social media usage by minors

Protecting Kids from Social Media Addiction Act

California State Legislature
- Long title: California SB 976
- Territorial extent: State of California
- Enacted by: State of California
- Enacted: September 20, 2024
- Signed by: Governor Gavin Newsom
- Signed: September 20, 2024

Legislative history
- Introduced by: Nancy Skinner
- Introduced: January 29, 2024
- Second reading: April 25, 2024
- Third reading: May 20, 2024
- Voting summary: 35 voted for; 2 voted against
- Second reading: August 20, 2024
- Third reading: August 31, 2024
- Voting summary: 47 voted for; 4 voted against

Keywords
- social media
- Status: Not fully in force

The Protecting Our Kids from Social Media Addiction Act, also known as California Senate Bill 976 (SB 976), is a law enacted in September 2024 to address problematic social media usage among minors.

The law prohibits minors from having "addictive feeds" without verifiable parental consent, restricts push notifications to minors between 12 am and 6 am and during school hours, requires certain default privacy settings for minors, and compels social media companies to publicly disclose certain metrics about their users.

The law was set to take effect in two steps. The requirements for addictive feeds, push notifications, default settings, and disclosures would have taken effect on January 1, 2025, and the age verification provision would have taken effect on January 1, 2027. However, the law has faced legal challenges since its enactment, delaying its implementation.

== Legal challenges ==
In November 2024, NetChoice, a trade association representing social media companies including YouTube, Facebook and Instagram, sued the California Attorney General Rob Bonta for an injunction stopping the first set of the law's provisions set to take effect in January 2025.

Judge Edward Davila partially granted the request, blocking the restrictions on notifications and public disclosures, but leaving the rest of the law unaffected. In January 2025, the Ninth Circuit Court of Appeals temporarily enjoined the entire bill pending appellate review. In September 2025, the Ninth Circuit ruled 3–0 to affirm the district court's ruling and allow the majority of the law.

In November 2025, Meta, Google and TikTok filed lawsuits arguing the law violates the First Amendment.
