= Moody v. NetChoice, LLC =

Moody v. NetChoice, LLC NetChoice, LLC v. Paxton
- Supreme Court of the United States

Argued February 26, 2024 Decided July 1, 2024
- Full case name: Ashley Moody, Attorney General of Florida, et al., v. NetChoice, LLC dba NetChoice, et al. NetChoice, LLC dba NetChoice, et al., v. Ken Paxton, Attorney General of Texas, et al.
- Docket nos.: 22-277; 22-555
- Citations: 603 U.S. 707 (more)

Questions presented
- 1. Whether the laws’ content-moderation restrictions comply with the First Amendment.; 2. Whether the laws’ individualized-explanation requirements comply with the First Amendment

Holding
- The judgments are vacated, and the cases are remanded, because neither the Eleventh Circuit nor the Fifth Circuit conducted a proper analysis of the facial First Amendment challenges to Florida and Texas laws regulating large internet platforms.

Court membership
- Chief Justice John Roberts Associate Justices Clarence Thomas · Samuel Alito; Sonia Sotomayor · Elena Kagan; Neil Gorsuch · Brett Kavanaugh; Amy Coney Barrett · Ketanji Brown Jackson

Case opinions
- Majority: Kagan, joined by Roberts, Sotomayor, Kavanaugh, Barrett; Jackson (Parts I, II and III-A)
- Concurrence: Barrett
- Concurrence: Jackson (in part and in judgment)
- Concurrence: Thomas (in judgment)
- Concurrence: Alito (in judgment), joined by Thomas, Gorsuch

Moody v. NetChoice, LLC and NetChoice, LLC v. Paxton, 603 U.S. 707 (2024), were United States Supreme Court cases related to protected speech under the First Amendment and content moderation by interactive service providers on the Internet under Section 230 of the Communications Decency Act. Moody and Paxton were challenges to two state statutes – enacted in Florida and Texas, respectively – that sought to limit this moderation. In July 2024, the justices vacated the lower-court decisions in both cases due to both courts failing to perform a full First Amendment assessment of the laws, and remanded them for further consideration.

== Background ==
Congress passed Section 230 as part of the Communications Decency Act in 1996, which offers interactive service providers such as social media platforms certain immunities from legal liability for content posted by their users, as well as a "Good Samaritan" clause for such providers to moderate content they deem "obscene, lewd, lascivious, filthy, excessively violent, harassing, or otherwise objectionable, whether or not such material is constitutionally protected." Section 230 has been considered an essential part of the rapid rise and success of the Internet in the United States.

Leading up to the 2020 United States elections, there was a rise of misinformation on these services related to topics such as claims of election fraud and conspiracy theories related to the COVID-19 pandemic. Much of this misinformation originated from conservative parties including the far right and alt right. Services like YouTube, Twitter, and Facebook took action to moderate such user-generated posts, either by tagging them as misinformation or removing them altogether.

Some of the affected content was put forth by Republican party members, including then-President Donald Trump, leading the Republican Party to question the efficacy of Section 230 in the belief that this law allowed politically motivated restrictions of social media content. The Republicans were further emboldened when Justice Clarence Thomas, in a dissenting opinion in the 2020 case Malwarebytes, Inc. v. Enigma Software Group USA, LLC, suggested that Section 230 gives too much immunity to service providers and that its goals should be revisited.

In 2021, Florida passed State Bill 7072 and Texas passed House Bill 20. Those bills addressed the ongoing controversies over social media content moderation and instituted contradictions to the procedures required under Section 230.

=== Moody v. NetChoice ===
In February 2021, Florida governor Ron DeSantis proposed a state bill that would prevent interactive service providers from deplatforming candidates for running for office, citing the removal of the Parler app from the Google and Apple app stores as an example of such restrictions. This led to the introduction of Florida State Bill (SB) 7072, which the state legislature passed in May 2021. The final bill would fine Internet firms if they banned a political official for more than 60 days, and instituted similar penalties on "journalistic enterprises" that operate in Florida and have either 100,000+ monthly users or 50,000+ subscribers. The bill included an exemption for providers that were also part of a company that operated a theme park or entertainment complex in Florida, which was taken to be a specific carve-out for Disney World. This exemption was removed later after DeSantis objected to The Walt Disney Company's challenge to the Florida Parental Rights in Education Act, which detractors would refer to as the "Don't Say Gay" law.

NetChoice and the Computer & Communications Industry Association (CCIA) challenged the law shortly after it was passed, via a lawsuit filed against Florida Attorney General Ashley Moody. Judge Robert Hinkle of the United States District Court for the Northern District of Florida granted a preliminary injunction against the enforcement of most of SB 7072 in June 2021, stating that "Balancing the exchange of ideas among private speakers is not a legitimate governmental interest." The Eleventh Circuit upheld most of the injunction in May 2022, dismissing the part of the injunction related to the theme park clause since by that point, the exemption had been removed.

=== NetChoice v. Paxton ===
In September 2021, the Texas state legislature passed Texas House Bill 20, a statute that would govern the operations, particularly with regard to content moderation, of social media companies with more than 50 million users. Among other provisions, the law forbade platforms from "censoring" (defined as essentially any mechanism by which content is removed or hidden) user-submitted content based on its viewpoint, barred email providers from impeding the transmission of emails under most circumstances (except where the content is obscene, illegal, or contains malicious code), and required platforms to provide detailed transparency reports and information about their content moderation policies.

After the bill was passed, NetChoice and CCIA sued Ken Paxton, the Attorney General of Texas, in federal court to block its enactment. On December 1, 2021, the United States District Court for the Western District of Texas granted a preliminary injunction against enforcement of the law. The court ruled that the law was unconstitutional because editorial discretion, including content moderation by Internet firms, is protected by the First Amendment. Texas appealed the district court's injunction, and in May 2022, a panel of the Fifth Circuit Court of Appeals issued a one-sentence, unexplained order granting a stay of the injunction and allowing the law to take effect.

Two days after the appeals court issued its stay, NetChoice and CCIA petitioned the Supreme Court to vacate the stay and reinstate the district court's injunction. They argued that the Fifth Circuit's unexplained order deprived them of "careful review and a meaningful decision" and that reinstating the district court's stay would preserve the status quo while the law's constitutionality continued to be litigated. On May 31, 2022, the Supreme Court vacated the Fifth Circuit decision by a 5–4 vote, allowing the injunction to take effect once more. Justices Samuel Alito, Clarence Thomas, and Neil Gorsuch dissented, writing that H.B. 20 was "novel" and that it was not clear how precedent should apply, so therefore the Supreme Court should not intervene. Justice Elena Kagan voted to deny the stay as well, but did not explain her decision.

On September 16, 2022, a panel of the Fifth Circuit ruled that the district court erred in issuing its injunction, saying that "[the platforms'] censorship is not speech", and remanded the case to the district court for further proceedings. The Fifth Circuit's ruling creates a circuit split with the Eleventh Circuit which, as described above, ruled differently on a district court injunction against the similar statute in Florida.

== Supreme Court proceedings ==
In September 2023, the Supreme Court agreed to jointly hear Moody v. NetChoice and NetChoice v. Paxton on questions of whether the Florida and Texas state statutes violate the First Amendment. The Court heard oral arguments on February 26, 2024.

Observers of the Supreme Court predicted that a majority of the justices would not uphold the states' laws as they likely violate the First Amendment, and would disagree with applying different standards to the largest social media platforms compared to other smaller sites that allow creative expression by users, such as Etsy. Because of the vagueness of these laws, court observers predicted that the Supreme Court would affirm the injunctions against enforcement of the laws, and remand the cases to the lower courts for further review. The Justices had questioned whether the large social media services are common carriers who should not discriminate against speech based on the topic, or whether they are private businesses that are free to moderate their platforms as desired, but this also led to questions of whether email providers like Gmail could practice such moderation.

The Court issued its decision on July 1, 2024. All nine justices agreed to vacate the Fifth and Eleventh Circuit rulings and remand the cases back to these courts, finding that neither court followed established case law in reviewing the First Amendment issues in question. Justice Elena Kagan wrote the majority opinion, joined by Roberts, Sotomayor, Kavanaugh, Barrett, and Jackson. Kagan wrote that in both cases, the appeals courts only evaluated the applicability of the laws to specific features of the social media sites, whereas a proper review would consider the laws' impact in all functions to weigh the constitutionality of the laws. Injunctions against execution of both laws remained in place with this decision.

=== Concurrences ===
Justice Amy Coney Barrett wrote a concurrence in which she cautioned NetChoice and the other challengers of the laws to assure that they focused on the constitutional challenge to the specific parts of the law that impacted their services rather than the law as a whole. Justice Ketanji Brown Jackson wrote a concurrence in judgement only, stating that she would not have gone as far as the majority to weigh in on aspects of the Texas law and "this Court should strive to avoid deciding more than is necessary". Justice Clarence Thomas wrote a concurrence in judgment only, similar to Jackson's concurrence in judgement, and echoing Barrett's concern that the federal courts should not rule on the constitutionality of an entire statute.

Justice Samuel Alito wrote a concurrence in judgment only, joined by Thomas and Gorsuch, agreeing with Thomas and Jackson that the court's opinion given to the lower courts on remand was unnecessary. Alito also cautioned of the comparison made between traditional forms of media and social media, and that "when confronted with the application of a constitutional requirement to new technology, we should proceed with caution."

== Proceedings after Supreme Court ruling ==
After the Supreme Court remanded both the cases to the 11th Circuit for the Moody case and the 5th Circuit for the Paxton case, both Circuit Courts further remanded the cases to the District Courts of both cases. NetChoice and CCIA filed amended complaints for both cases in the District Court. The first ruling after the Supreme Court decision was on May 22, 2025, when U.S District Judge Robert Hinkle declined Florida's motion to dismiss the case.

== Analysis ==
According to CNN based on information from the court, the justices all agreed that the Fifth Circuit's and Eleventh Circuit's First Amendment analyses were inadequate, and that NetChoice's choice to challenge the constitutionality of the laws on broad strokes instead of specific aspects did not help their case. Alito led a 5–4 majority to remand the cases, but his draft decision strongly favored the position of the states by stating that content moderation was not a protected activity under the First Amendment. According to CNN, this led both Barrett and Jackson to switch their vote to Kagan's view, as they considered Alito's stance too extreme, leading to the 6–3 decision on the majority opinion.
