= European Union Public Licence =

Free software license

- Author: European Commission
- Latest version: 1.2
- Publisher: European Union
- Published: January 2007 (v 1.0), May 2017 (v 1.2)
- SPDX identifier: EUPL-1.0, EUPL-1.1, EUPL-1.2
- Debian FSG compatible: Yes
- FSF approved: Yes
- OSI approved: Yes
- GPL compatible: Yes, by licensing derivatives that include GPL covered code
- Copyleft: Yes
- Linking from code with a different license: Yes, as it depends on the applicable copyright law in the European Union country where the Licensor resides or has their registered office for defining what qualifies as a derivative work.
- Website: interoperable-europe.ec.europa.eu/collection/eupl

The European Union Public Licence (EUPL) is a free software licence that was written and approved by the European Commission. The licence is available in 23 official languages of the European Union. All linguistic versions have the same validity. EUPL v1.2 was published in May 2017. Revised documentation for v1.2 was issued in late 2021.

Software has been licensed under the EUPL since the launch of the European Open Source Observatory and Repository (OSOR) in October 2008, now part of Joinup collaborative platform. Although private individuals can utilize the EUPL, its primary users to date have been governments, administrations, and local authorities.

== History ==
EUPL was originally intended to be used for the distribution of software developed in the framework of the IDABC program. Given its generic scope, it is also suitable for use by any software developer. Its main goal is its focusing on being consistent with the copyright law in the Member States of the European Union, while retaining compatibility with popular free software licences such as the GNU General Public License. The first IDABC software packages mentioned are CIRCA groupware, IPM and the eLink G2G, G2C, G2B specification software.

== Comparison to other open source/free software licences ==
EUPL is the first open source licence to be released by an international governing body. A goal of this licence is to create an open-source licence available into 23 official languages of the European Union, and that is sure to conform to the existing copyright laws of the Member States of the European Union.

The licence was developed with other open-source licences in mind and specifically authorizes covered works to be re-released under the following licences, when combined with their covered code in larger works:

Explicit license compatibility	Added in version
GNU General Public License (GPL) v. 2 & v. 3	GPL v2: EUPL v1.0, GPL v3: EUPL v1.2
Open Software License (OSL) v. 2.1, v. 3.0	EUPL v1.0
Common Public License v. 1.0	EUPL v1.0
Eclipse Public License v. 1.0	EUPL v1.0
CeCILL v. 2.0 & V 2.1	EUPL v1.0
Mozilla Public License v. 2	EUPL v1.2
LGPL v2.1 & V3	EUPL v1.2
LiLIQ-R & LiLIQ-R+	EUPL v1.2
GNU Affero General Public License (AGPL) v. 3	EUPL v1.2

Many other OSI-approved licences are compatible with the EUPL: Joinup published a general compatibility matrix between all OSI-approved licences and the EUPL.

An overview of the EUPL licence and on what makes it different has been published in OSS-Watch.

In 2020, the European Commission publishes its Joinup Licensing Assistant, which makes possible the selection and comparison of more than 50 licences, with access to their SPDX identifier and full text.

== Versions ==
EUPL v1.0 was approved on 9 January 2007.

EUPL v1.1 was approved by the European Commission on 9 January 2009. EUPL v1.1 is OSI certified as from March 2009.

EUPL v1.2 was published in May 2017. EUPL v1.2 is OSI certified in July 2017.

=== Version 1.2 ===
The EUPL v1.2 was prepared as from June 2013 its decision process started in 2016 and released on 19 May 2017. A principal objective of the EUPL v1.2 is to update the appendix of compatible licences to cover newer popular licences such as the GNU GPLv3 and AGPLv3.

According to the EUPL v.1.1, the European Commission may publish other linguistic versions and/or new versions of the EUPL, so far this is required and reasonable, without reducing the scope of the rights granted by the Licence. Future upgrades will not be applicable automatically when software was expressly released "under the EUPL v.1.1 only".

New provisions cover the Application service provider loophole of software distribution: Distribution and/or Communication (of software) includes providing on-line "access to its essential functionalities".

While the GPL is incompatible with several other licences, EUPL v1.2 is compatible with all other reciprocal licences listed in the EUPL appendix. Compatibility means that after merging the covered code with code covered by a compatible licence, the resulting (combined) derivative work can be distributed under the compatible license.

The EUPL is interoperable, without any "viral effect", in the case of static and dynamic linking. This currently depends on European and national law, according to the Computer Programs Directive (Directive 91/250 EEC or 2009/24). Recital 10 of this Directive defines interoperability and recital 15 states that for making two programs interoperable, the code needed can be copied, translated or adapted. For example, take program A (new original code just written) and program B (a program licensed by a third party), the developer/licensor of A, who is also a legitimate holder or recipient of B may reproduce in A the needed code from B (e.g. the APIs or the needed data structures from program B) without copyright infringement and without authorization from the copyright holder of B. The licensor of A can do and distribute this without being bonded by conditions or limitations imposed by a licence of program B. This must stay compatible with the normal use of program B and cannot prejudice the legitimate interest of the copyright holder of B.

Unlike the "articles", the directive "recitals" are not transposed as such in national laws. Recitals are part of European law: they aim to help understand the scope and motivation of the law for use by courts in interpreting the law. While recitals in EU Directives and Regulations are not considered to have independent legal value, they can expand an ambiguous provision's scope. They cannot restrict an unambiguous provision's scope, but they can be used to determine the nature of a provision, or to adapt it to new circumstances.

=== Interoperability ===
There are several different notions of "strong copyleft". According to the GPL/AGPL licensor vision, there are some restrictions and conditions regarding interoperability (in relation to the legal view that linking other software with the covered code creates a combined derivative) and regarding compatibility (since no derivative can be licensed under another license, which may create incompatibilities). The EUPL vision, based on EU law, differs in its view that linking does not create derivatives and when merging differently licensed source code is needed, the resulting derivative can be licensed under a compatible licence. For some of those, the copyleft is viewed as "weaker" (i.e. the MPL), but this has no impact, in the EUPL interpretation because according to the EUPL, the compatible licence will prevail when its provisions conflict with those of the EUPL. Since none of the compatible license prohibits the strong reciprocity implemented by the EUPL (obligation to publish and share the source code of derivatives, even distributed through a network) the copyleft resulting from the EUPL can be considered as strong. For this reason, the German lawyer Niklas Plutte described the EUPL as being an "interoperable copyleft licence".

=== Philosophy ===
In November 2023, a discussion paper, "The seven pillars of wisdom", published in the framework of the adoption of the Interoperable Europe Act, was proposed for discussion by the writing author of the EUPL-1.2 and explains the philosophy behind the EUPL text.

== Member states policies ==
As from 2010, EU member states adopt or revise policies aimed to encourage – when appropriate – the open source distribution of public sector applications. The EUPL is formally mentioned in some of these policies:

- Malta
- Spain
- Estonia: Ministry of Economic Affairs and Communications, Department of State Information Systems. Information Society Yearbook 2009.
- Slovakia
- France: Décret n° 2021-1559 of 1 December 2021, amending the Code of Relations between the Public and the Administration, Article D323-2-1, et seq.

== Notable usage ==
The EUPL is used by various public administrations and software projects to ensure legal interoperability and compliance with European law. Notable examples include:

- AusweisApp2: The official software for the German electronic identity card (eID).
- Diia: The Ukrainian e-governance web portal and mobile applications for iOS and Android.
- E-Rezept: The German electronic prescription mobile applications for iOS and Android.
- OpenTalk: A video conferencing solution released under the EUPL to ensure digital sovereignty.
- Pi-hole: A Linux network-level advertisement and Internet tracker blocking application intended for use on private networks.
- Set-OutlookSignatures: A PowerShell-based solution for the centralized management of Outlook signatures and out-of-office replies.
- WLED: An implementation of an ESP32/ESP8266 webserver to control LEDs.

== See also ==
- Software using the European Union Public Licence
- Comparison of free and open-source software licenses
- GPL linking exception
