= E-government in Europe =

Use of technology to provide public services in Europe

All European countries show e-government initiatives, mainly related to the improvement of governance at the national level. Significant e-government activities also take place at the European Commission level as well. There is an extensive list of e-government fact sheets maintained by the European Commission.

== E-government at the European Commission level ==
The European Commission is actively supporting e-government both at the national level and at its supranational level. The vice-president for Administrative Affairs is responsible for the advancement of e-government at the Commission level through large-scale activities that implement the e-Commission strategy. The Information Society and Media Directorate-General and the Directorate-General for Informatics implement this strategy, through several programmes and related activities. Two of the most prominent such initiatives are the IDABC programme, and its successor, ISA. IDABC is guided and monitored by a team of national experts. The e-government policy of the European Commission until 2010 is described by the i2010 Action Plan that defines the principles and directions of e-government policy of the European Commission. Other projects funded by the European Commission include Access-eGov, EGovMoNet and SemanticGov.

In view of the next five-year period, the ministers responsible for eGovernment of the EU convened in Malmö, Sweden and unanimously presented the Ministerial Declaration on eGovernment on 18 November 2009. This document presents the vision, political priorities and objectives of the EU for the period 2010–2015.

The next eGovernment Action Plan that describes the directions for the period starting at 2011 has been announced by the European Commission under the name Europe 2020 and is expected to be formally adopted in June 2010.

Beside the member states, most (if not all) e-government activities of the European Commission target in addition the candidate countries and the EFTA countries. As of 2009, the complete list comprises 34 countries: Austria, Belgium, Bulgaria, Croatia, Cyprus, Czech Republic, Denmark, Estonia, Finland, France, Germany, Greece, Hungary, Iceland, Ireland, Italy, Latvia, Liechtenstein, Lithuania, Luxembourg, Macedonia, Malta, Netherlands, Norway, Poland, Portugal, Romania, Slovakia, Slovenia, Spain, Sweden, Switzerland, Turkey, and the United Kingdom.

=== IDABC ===
IDABC stands for Interoperable Delivery of European eGovernment Services to public Administrations, Businesses and Citizens.

IDABC was a European Union Program launched in 2004 that promoted the correct use of information and communication technologies (ICT) for cross-border services in Europe. It aimed to stimulate the development of online platforms delivering public e-Services in Europe. It used the opportunities offered by ICT to encourage and support the delivery of cross-border public sector services to citizens and enterprises in Europe, to improve efficiency and collaboration between European public administrations and to contribute to making Europe an attractive place to live, work and invest.

To achieve objectives like "Interoperability", IDABC issued recommendations, developed solutions and provided services that enable national and European administrations to communicate electronically while offering modern public services to businesses and citizens in Europe. In the context of IDABC the European Interoperability Framework version 1.0 was issued.

The programme also provided financing to projects addressing European policy requirements, thus improving cooperation between administrations across Europe. National public sector policy-makers were represented in the IDABC programme's management committee and in many expert groups. This made the programme a unique forum for the coordination of national eGovernment policies.

By using state-of-the-art information and communication technologies, developing common solutions and services and by finally, providing a platform for the exchange of good practice between public administrations, IDABC contributed to the i2010 initiative of modernising the European public sector. IDABC was a Community programme managed by the European Commission's Directorate-General for Informatics.

In 2008, IDABC launched the Semantic Interoperability Centre Europe (SEMIC.EU). eGovernment and other pan-European collaborations can exchange their knowledge and their visions on SEMIC.EU. In the same year, IDABC launched the OSOR.eu website with the aim to facilitate the collaboration between public administrations in their use of open-source software.

IDABC followed the Interchange of Data across Administrations (IDA) program.

The new Interoperability Solutions for European Public Administrations (ISA) programme was adopted by the Council and the European Parliament in September 2009 and has replaced the IDABC programme, which came to an end on 31 December 2009.

=== Interoperability Solutions for European Public Administrations (ISA) ===
Interoperability Solutions for European Public Administrations or ISA was a European Commission e-government programme for the period 2010–2015. On 29 September 2008, the Commission approved a proposal for a Decision of the European Parliament and the Council of Ministers regarding a new programme for the period 2010–15. The Decision was formally adopted on 16 September 2009. This programme was a follow-on to IDABC, which had come to an end on 31 December 2009. The ISA programme focussed on back-office solutions, where interoperable solutions and processes were expected to "promote the efficient and effective delivery of public services to citizens and enterprises across borders and sectors", thereby supporting the interaction between European public administrations and the implementation of Community policies and activities. An ISA Committee was established to support the programme.

ISA supported cross-border large scale projects launched under the auspice of the ICT Policy Support Programme.

== EU member states ==
=== Austria ===
==== Brief history ====
E-government had an early start in Austria. Since its beginning, public authorities and e-government project teams have continually been working to expand and improve public services and underlying processes.

In 1995, the Federal Government set up an Information Society Working Group tasked with identifying the opportunities and threats posed by the development of the information society. In 1998, an IT-Cooperation Agreement was signed between the federal state and the various regions. In May 2003, the federal government launched an e-government initiative, the eGovernment Offensive, to establish an electronic file management system, as a prerequisite for co-ordinating all eGovernment activities in the country. In the following year, the short-term goal of the eGovernment Offensive – achieving a place in the EU's top 5 eGovernment leaders – was fulfilled, as Austria was ranked No. 4 in the annual e-government benchmarking survey. In 2007 according to the study The User Challenge – Benchmarking the Supply of Online Public Services, Austria is listed as the first EU member state to achieve a 100% fully online availability score for all services for citizens.

==== Legislation ====
The eGovernment Act and the General Law on Administration Processes and the Electronic Signature Act set the main e-government framework in Austria. Austria was the first EU Member State to implement the EU Electronic Signatures Directive.

The Austrian legal e-government framework (substantially revised at the end of 2007) defines the following principles for the Austrian e-government strategy:

- Proximity to citizens
- Convenience through efficiency
- Trust and security
- Transparency
- Accessibility
- Usability
- Data security
- Cooperation
- Sustainability
- Interoperability
- Technological neutrality

Key to the e-government evolution process in Austria is the introduction of electronic data processing systems based upon citizen cards. Service providers from the public and the private sector can provide electronic services using the citizen cards for authentication.

==== Key actors ====
The central element of e-government in Austria is the Digital Austria platform which is supervised by the federal chief information officer, who is also providing consultation services to the federal government regarding policy, strategy and implementation issues. The State Secretary in the Federal Chancellery is responsible for e-government strategy at the federal level.

=== Belgium ===
In the 2009 Smarter, Faster, Better eGovernment – eighth Benchmark Measurement report prepared for the European Commission, Belgium is placed on the 16th position among the EU27+ (Note: EU27+ referred to the participating countries in the 8th EU Benchmark, which included the 27 EU Member States at the time and Croatia, Iceland, Norway, and Switzerland.) countries with respect to the full online availability of e-government services and on the 12th position with respect to their online sophistication. The country also places 24th (out of 189 countries) in the UN eGovernment Readiness Index 2008 and 18th (out of 133 countries) in the WEF Global Competitiveness Index 2009–2010.

==== Strategy ====
The Belgian e-government strategy is aimed at creating a single virtual public administration to be characterised by fast and convenient service delivery, at the same time respecting the privacy of users. The services shall be developed around the needs of citizens, putting in place complete electronic administrative procedures independently from actual authorities being involved. In addition, simplified procedures shall provide for a reduced bureaucracy. To this end the strategy suggests four main streams all efforts should be structured around:

1. Re-engineering and integrating service delivery around users' needs and life events;
2. Cooperation among all levels of government;
3. Simplification of administrative procedures for citizens and businesses;
4. Back office integration and protection of personal data.

Taking into account the federal structure of Belgium, the second strategic stream addresses the implementation of e-government efforts throughout all levels of Federal, Regional, and Community authorities. The framework for this co-operation was set by the eGovernment Cooperation Agreement, adopted in 2001, expressing in particular the commitment of all government layers to use the same standards, identification infrastructure, and e-signature. This agreement was later re-conducted and enhanced by a cooperation agreement on the principles of a seamless e-government in 2006. Key aspects addressed by the latter document include:

- provision of public services following an intentioned based and user friendly approach placing emphasis on security and confidentiality aspects;
- ensuring interoperability of e-government solutions;
- maximising the re-usability of e-government developments and services;
- ensuring that data would be collected only once and would be re-used to a maximum extend.

==== Legislation ====
To achieve the objectives of the second cooperation agreement, a resolution on a seamless government was adopted in 2006, focussing on a close cooperation regarding identification and implementation of principles for a seamless e-government and on the development and usage of the corresponding services. At the regional and communal level, further e-government strategies have been put in place within the framework of competencies of the respective administrations.

At the federal level, the Minister for Enterprise and Simplification holds the responsibility for the computerisation of public services. The minister is responsible for FedICT, the federal agency in charge of e-government and the information society. This agency aims in particular at:

- developing a common e-government strategy,
- coordinating related actions, and
- ensuring its consistent implementation within the federal administration.

==== Key actors ====
Coordination and implementation of e-government services in the social sector lies in the responsibility of the Crossroads Bank (CBSS). Additional e-government projects are being implemented by further federal departments, ministries and agencies on a joint or individual basis. At the regional level, dedicated entities have been created for the implementation of respective strategies, namely, the Coordination Cell for Flemish e-Government (CORVE) in Flanders, the eAdministration and Simplification Unit (EASI-WAL) in Wallonia, and the Brussels Regional Informatics Centre (BRIC) in the Brussels-Capital Region.

The federal portal belgium.be serves as a single access point to all e-government services for both citizens and businesses. The content is offered in French, Dutch, German and English. In addition, dedicated portals have been set up for the different regions of Belgium offering a broad spectrum of relevant information. These are the Flemish regional portal vlaanderen.be, the Walloon regional portal wallonie.be, and the Brussels regional portal.

At the community level, the portals of the French-speaking community and of the German-speaking community mainly focus on information on communities' administrative procedures and services.

With respect to the exchange of information in the public sector, the Federal Metropolitan Area Network (FedMAN) constitutes a high-speed network connecting the administrations of 15 federal ministries and the government service buildings in Brussels.

==== National infrastructure ====
In the area of e-identification, Belgium launched a large-scale distribution of electronic identity cards (eID) in 2004. Beyond their functions as traditional identification and travel documents, the Belgian eID cards can be used for identification in restricted online services. They are implemented as smart cards containing two certificates, one to be used for authentication, and another one for generating digital signatures. The eID cards can be used within almost all governmental electronic signature applications. Moreover, an electronic ID card for the under-12s (Kids-ID) was introduced in March 2009, enabling kids to access children-only Internet chat rooms as well as a range of emergency phone numbers.

In the area of eProcurement, an eNotification platform was launched in 2002. This platform is currently used by all federal authorities for notifying invitations to tenders. Businesses can browse through the published notices to identify tender opportunities. This system communicates with the eTendering platform enabling published notices to be accessed and processed by economic operators and contracting authorities within the framework of the tendering phase.

Finally, the Belgian e-government relies on the concept of authentic sources. According to this approach, public entities store the data collected from citizens only once in their databases and, whenever needed, they exchange missing data among themselves. Such databases include:

- the National Register (basic data of Belgian citizens);
- the Crossroads Bank for Enterprises (business register containing all authentic sources for all Belgian enterprises); and
- the Crossroads Bank for Social Security Register (data relating to persons registered with the Belgian Social security).

=== Bulgaria ===
Bulgaria has developed its information technology infrastructures and expanded relevant services in the e-government sector.

This includes the creation of:

- egov.bg: the official e-government portal;
- a National Health portal;
- eID cards;
- eHealth cards.
- the eSender service;
- the ePayment Gateway.

==== Strategy ====
The Bulgarian government has developed an e-government strategy aiming to render the Bulgarian economy more competitive and at the same time satisfy the needs of its citizens and businesses thanks to efficient and effective administrative services. The principal e-government activities focus on:

- The development of central e-government systems, comprising the creation of an e-government web portal, and the launch of a communication strategy to inform the public on e-government and safety when using those systems and the services provided.
- Support to regional and local administrations, namely, one stop shop services for regional administrations and technical assistance to municipal administrations (hardware, software, and e-government best practices).
- Training of the administrations' staff in information technologies and the use of eGovernment services; the training can be divided into training for IT specialists, and mass training for the administration employees.

==== Key actors ====
The Ministry of Transport, Information Technology and Communications (MTITC) is responsible for laying down the policies (at national and regional levels) that govern e-government strategy in Bulgaria, and also for coordination and the provision of the necessary support. However, the implementation of e-government projects falls under the responsibility of the competent ministries and administrative bodies.

=== Croatia ===
Significant progress has been achieved in Croatia as the government has been making a considerable effort to develop information society infrastructure and improve relevant eServices. The e-government strategy of the Government of Croatia is defined in the eCroatia Programme. The main objective of that programme is the constant development and the provision of accessible eServices to citizens and businesses in various fields, namely, the public administration, health, education, and the judicial system. The outcome of this action will thus contribute to diminishing bureaucracy, minimising illegal activities while reducing cost to government operations and facilitate government interaction with citizens and businesses.

An ICT legal framework has been created and regulated by a set of laws which is also supplemented by the Convention on Cybercrime (OG 173/2003) and the Electronic Document Act (OG 150/2005). That legal framework covers a wide variety of domains:

- Freedom of Information Legislation (Act on the Right of Access to Information),
- Data Protection/Privacy Legislation (Law on Personal Data Protection (OG 103/2003)),
- eCommerce Legislation (Electronic Commerce Act (OG 173/2003)),
- eCommunications Legislation (Electronic Communications Act (OG 73/2008)),
- eSignatures Legislation (Electronic Signature Act (OG 10/2002)), and
- eProcurement Legislation (Law for Public Procurement (OG 117/01)).

In 2010, the body responsible for laying down the e-government policies and strategies and for the coordination and implementation of the eCroatia Programme was the Central State Administrative Office for eCroatia.

=== Cyprus ===
==== Brief history ====
In March 1989 a National Government Computerisation Master Plan was adopted for the period 1989–1997 aiming to examine the governmental information needs and identify potential ICT applications. To speed up the process of implementing the plan, the Data Management Strategy (DMS) later adopted provided structural information to fulfil the requirements in the public sector. At a later stage the Information Systems Strategy (ISS) acted as a complementary plan aiming to provide good quality of services to the public. Eventually in 2002 the eGovernment Strategy was adopted updating thus the ISS. Since January 2006 all government ministries, departments, and services have their own website. At the same year the first government web portal, was launched making accessible several governmental and non-governmental websites and many informative and interactive services. Since 2008 the main aim of the strategy has been to take steps towards productivity and growth until 2015 following closely the EU policies and directives. Many of the basic objectives of the eEurope Action Plan were fulfilled and the government is now promoting the Lisbon strategy of the European Commission.

==== Legislation ====
Although there is no specific e-government legislation in Cyprus, section 19 of the Cyprus Constitution protects the "right to freedom of speech and expression". The data protection and privacy is being ensured by two main laws: the Processing of Personal Data (Protection of Individuals) Law, which came into force in 2001, and the Retention of Telecommunication Data for Purposes of Investigation of Serious Criminal Offences Law of 2007.

The Law for Electronic Signatures (N. 188(I)/2004) establishes the legal framework around additional requirements for the use of electronic signatures in the public sector; however, it does not change any rules created by other legislation regarding the use of the documents.

The e-procurement legislation in Cyprus has been put into force at the beginning of 2006. At a latter stage, the eProcurement system was implemented based on the provisions of the specific law (N.12(I)2006). The system aims to support the electronic publication and evaluation of tenders, and is available free of charge for all contractors in the Republic of Cyprus and all economic operators in Cyprus and abroad.

==== Actors ====
Since February 2009 the Minister of Communications and Works became the minister in charge for the information society. A national information society strategy was established by the Department of Electronic Communications, whereas an advisory committee chaired by the Permanent Secretary of the Ministry of Communications and Works was constituted by the representatives of relevant ministries, industry, and academia.

The Directorate for the Coordination of the Computerisation of the Public Sector is in charge of the computerisation project of the civil service. The departments responsible for the implementation of the information technology are:

- Ministry of Finance – Department of Information Technology Services (DITS).
- Ministry of Finance – Department of Public Administration and Personnel (PAPD).
- Ministry of Communications and Works.
- Office of the Commissioner of Electronic Communications and Postal Regulation.
- Government Offices, e.g. Police, and Army.

The infrastructure components of Cyprus include the Cyprus Governmental portal, the Government Data Network (GDN) and Government Internet Node (GIN), the eProcurement System. and the Office Automation System (OAS).

=== Czech Republic ===
==== Strategy ====
The core principles guiding the development of e-government are listed in a policy document applicable for the period 2008–2012, the Strategy for the development of Information Society services ("Strategie rozvoje služeb pro 'informační společnost'" in Czech). The e-government concept it contains can be summed up as follows: e-government is the means to satisfy the citizens' expectations as to public services while modernising the public administration, in a way to cut both red tape and costs. Citizen satisfaction stands as the ultimate indicator of success. To reach success, the relevant legal basis must be established and the supporting infrastructure must be made interoperable.

==== Major developments ====
The Czech Republic is one of the few EU Member States to have an eGovernment Act. The Czech eGovernment Act – the Act on Electronic Actions and Authorised Document Conversion ("ZÁKON o elektronických úkonech a autorizované konverzi dokumentů" in Czech) is in force since July 2009, and it provides for the following set of principles:

- Electronic documents are equally valid as paper documents are;
- The digitalisation of paper documents is enabled;
- Electronic document exchange with and within the public administration must be as simple as possible and fully secured, by means of certified electronic signatures;
- Government to business (G2B) and government to government (G2G) communications shall be stored on the dedicated Data Box set up by each legal person, be that private or public. More than a simple email box, a Data Box is an authenticated communication channel. Citizens may set up a Data Box if they wish so.

It is worth highlighting that the Data Boxes Information System was successfully activated on 1 November 2009, as required by the eGovernment Act.

Other developments include:

- The Public Information Portal, selected online information and electronic services from central and local government alike.
- All of the public services aimed at businesses have been made available online.
- The Czech POINTs network – a network of over 3700 offices (data available in August 2009) disseminated throughout the entire territory. They are the citizens' local contact points with the public administration. In these offices, citizens can request and obtain printouts of public register extracts.
- The Tax Portal for the Public.
- The eJustice Portal (unfortunately not containing Czech laws).

==== Actors ====
Responsibility for steering and coordinating the e-government policy lies with the Czech Ministry of Interior. The latter is assisted in this task by the Deputy Minister for Information Technology. The Government Council for the Information Society provides expert and technical support. At the local level, the regions and municipalities perform their own eGovernment initiatives under the supervision of the Ministry of the Interior.

=== Denmark ===
==== Overview ====
According to the Towards Better Digital Service: Increased Efficiency and Stronger Collaboration strategy paper, e-government in Denmark has taken considerable steps in developing an effective network of public electronic services. As stated at page 6 of this document:

E-government has come a long way in recent years. Today digitalization is a natural part of the provision of government services throughout the public sector – and Denmark occupies a leading position internationally regarding e-government development. We need to retain and develop that position."

To this end, the Danish government, the Local Government Denmark (LGDK), and the Danish Regions have joined their forces.

==== Strategy ====
Denmark's e-government policy is based on the following three priority areas:

- better digital service;
- increased efficiency through digitalisation; and
- stronger, binding collaboration on digitalisation.

The Realising the Potential (2004–2006) strategy paper added impetus to the development of the public sector's internal digitalisation, while the Towards eGovernment: Vision and Strategy for the Public Sector in Denmark (2001–2004), marked the beginning of a joint cooperation among the municipal, regional, and state levels of administration towards digitalisation.

==== Key actors ====
The main actors that implement, co-ordinate, support, and maintain eGovernment policies in Denmark are mainly the Ministry for Science, Technology, and Innovation, the Steering Committee for joint-government cooperation (STS), the Digital Task Force, and the National IT and Telecom Agency Local Government Denmark.

In the 2009 European eGovernment Awards, the Danish Genvej portal won the eGovernment Empowering Citizens prize. Three more portals were among the finalists of the 2009 eGovernment Awards: the Oresunddirekt Service was among the finalists in the category "eGovernment supporting the Single Market", the EasyLog-in in the category "eGovernment Enabling Administrative Efficiency and Effectiveness", and the NemHandel – Open shared e-business infrastructure in the category "eGovernment Empowering Businesses".

=== Estonia ===
Estonia is widely recognized as e-Estonia, as a reference to its tech-savvy government and society. E-government in Estonia is an intertwined ecosystem of institutional, legal and technological frameworks that jointly facilitate an independent and decentralized application development by public and private institutions to replace conventional public services with digital ones. The most crucial components of e-government in Estonia are digital identification of citizens (e-ID), a digital data exchange layer (X-Road) and ultimately, a layer of applications developed by different public and private institutions.

Estonia has established its e-government program with the support of the European Union since 1996 with the introduction of e-banking. In 2017, Estonia described its digital inclusiveness under the name of e-government with a wide array of e-services in government affairs, political participation, education, justice, health, accommodation, police, taxes, and business.

Estonia conducts legally binding i-voting at national and local elections and offers e-residency to foreigners.

Estonia shares its knowledge of developing its e-society with other countries through its E-Governance Academy (Estonian: e-Riigi Akadeemia). The academy has trained over 4,500 officials from more than 60 countries and led or participated in more than 60 international ICT projects on the national, local and organizational levels.

==== ID-card project ====
Estonia's success in transforming their public services online is based on the widespread use of electronic identification cards. Since 2002 about 1.2 million of these credit-card size personal identification documents have been issued allowing citizens to digitally identify themselves and sign documents, to vote electronically (since 2005), create a business, verify banking transactions, be used as a virtual ticket, and view medical history (since 2010).

ID-cards are compulsory for all citizens and they are equally valid for digital and physical identification. Physically, they are valid for identification in Estonia, but more importantly, they are also valid for travel in most European countries. Thus, in addition to their primary functionality – digital identification – ID-cards are effectively used as replacements for traditional identification documents.

The digital ID project started already as early as in 1998 when Estonia had sought solutions on how to digitally identify their citizens. By 1999 a viable project in the form of current ID-card was proposed and the legal framework to enable digital identification was set up in the following years. In 2000 the Identity Documents Act and the Digital Signatures Act, the two most important bills regulating the use of digital IDs, were passed in the parliament. The first states the conditions to which an ID-card must adhere to, but most importantly states that the ID-card is compulsory for all Estonian citizens. The latter, states the conditions for a state-governed certification registry, which is fundamentally linked to the functioning of the digital ID-card. Following these events, the first ID-cards where issued in January 2002. Since then about 1.24 million of digital ID-cards have been issued. By the end of 2014 digital ID card has been used about 315 million times for personal identification and 157 million times for digital signatures. An average annual growth rate over 12 years (from 2003 to 2014) amounts to about 7.4 million authentications, and about 3.5 million signatures per year.

==== X-Road system ====
As technology is the primary enabler of e-governance, the critical question is how to ensure secure communication between scattered government databases and institutions that use different procedures and technologies to deliver their services. Estonia's solution to this problem was to develop the X-Road, a secure internet-based data exchange layer that enables state's different information systems to communicate and exchange data with each other.

X-Road serves as platform for application development by which any state institution can extend their physical services into an electronic environment. For example, if an institution wishes to develop an online application, it can apply to join the X-Road and upon joining, automatically gain access to different state-managed data sets and services. These services include client authentication (either by ID-card, mobile-ID or the internet banks authentication systems); authorization, registry services, query design services to various state managed data depositories and registries, data entry, secure data exchange, logging, query tracking, visualization environment, central and local monitoring, etc. Therefore, X-Road offers a seamless point of interaction between those extending their services online and.

Another feature of X-Road is its decentralized nature. X-Road is an environment for efficient data exchange, but it has no monopoly over individual data repositories that belong to institutions that join the X-Road. Moreover, X-Road requires every joining institution to share their data with others if necessary. Every institution and application can use the data stored in other repositories in order to avoid repetitive data collection from the client side. Because the data sharing enables development of more convenient services, this system implicitly incentives the reuse of the data. Such a collective process allows for more efficient user experience and thus increases interest from state institutions to develop digital services as well as individuals to reach out to the state.

==== E-services ====
When the digital identification and the data exchange layer were provided by the state, different institutions have developed their own extension of their services into the digital realm. Numerous online public services are available to Estonian citizens and residents including eID, e-signature, e-taxes, online medical prescriptions, i-voting, e-police, e-health care, e-notary, e-banking, e-census, e-school and much more. Driven by convenience, most of the services offer efficiency in terms of money and time saved by the citizens as well as public officials. For example, selling a car in Estonia can be done remotely with less than 15 minutes, filing an online tax declaration takes an average person no more than five minutes, and participating in elections by Internet voting takes 90 seconds on average.

==== Strategy ====
The basic policy documents concerning the national e-government in Estonia are the Principles of the Estonian Information Policy, approved in May 1998, and the Principles of the Estonian Information Policy 2004–2006, approved in spring 2004. In 2007 the Estonian Information Society Strategy 2013 entered into force, setting the objectives for ICT use from 2007 to 2013. In 2005 a nationwide information security policy was launched aiming to create a safe Estonian information society for business and consumers.

The legal foundations for realization of e-government in Estonia were laid down from 1996 to 2001, with the following Acts adopted by the Estonian Parliament:

- the Personal Data Protection Act which entered in force in 1996: the Act protects the personal rights in terms of personal data processing;
- the Digital Signatures Act which entered into force in 2000: the Act defines the legal validity of electronic vs. handwritten signatures; and
- the Public Information Act which entered into force in 2000: the Act aims to establish an Administration System where all databases and information systems should be registered.

In 1998 the Government of Estonia adopted the principles of the Estonian Information Society as well as the Information Policy Action Plan – the country's first information society strategy documents.

The main body for the development and implementation of the state information policy in Estonia is the Ministry of Economic Affairs and Communications, and especially the Department of State Information Systems (RISO). Moreover, the Estonian Informatics Centre (RIA), develops the main governmental infrastructure components.

The following components can be mentioned as examples of the Estonian e-government infrastructure:

- The national eGovernment portal, launched in 2003;
- EEBone;
- Public Procurement State Register;
- X-road middleware; and
- Health Information System.

In 2018, the government office and the ministry of economic affairs and communications of Estonia announced that it will also launch a cross-sectoral project to analyse and prepare the implementation of artificial intelligences (kratts). An expert group has been set up that will comprise state authorities, universities, companies, and independent experts. As part of this project, regulation will be set up for AI.

=== Finland ===
In the 8th EU Benchmark report prepared in 2009 for the European Commission, Finland is considered to be a top performer country in most eGovernment and information society benchmarks. In this report, Finland stands on the seventh position among the EU27+ countries with respect to the full online availability of its services and on the seventh position with respect to their online sophistication. The latter indicator reflects the maturity of online services by classifying them into five categories (sophistication levels) according to their transactional abilities. In this area Finland belongs to the so-called fast growers, i.e. countries which improved their relative performance by at least 10% in comparison to 2007 sophistication results. In addition, the country is in third place with respect to the provision of automated/personalised e-government services, i.e. those reaching the Pro-active fifth sophistication level. Finland is among the countries featuring the maximum possible score (100%) regarding usability of e-government services, user satisfaction monitoring, and user-focused portal design.

==== Strategy ====
Finland's long-term strategic vision with respect to e-government is laid down in the National Knowledge Society Strategy 2007–2015 document, adopted in September 2006. This strategy aims to turn Finland into an "internationally attractive, humane and competitive knowledge and service society" by the year 2015. To achieve this vision, the strategy focuses on four main strategic intents, namely those of:

- "Making Finland a human-centric and competitive service society": Multi-channel, proactive, and interactive e-services shall be put in place at the disposal of citizens and businesses. These services shall operate on a customer-oriented and economic manner. Moreover, the acquisition processes of enterprises and the public administration should be made electronic throughout the purchase and supply chain.
- "Turning ideas into products; a reformed innovation system": New products, services and social innovations shall be developed on the basis of cooperation between universities, research institutions, public administration, organisations, and enterprises. Thereby, design and user orientation of the envisaged products or services are considered to be key success factors.
- "Competent and learning individuals and work communities": Appropriate measures shall be taken to facilitate citizens developing knowledge as this is an important factor for securing Finland's competitiveness in the long term.
- "An interoperable information society infrastructure, the foundation of an Information Society": Finland aims to put in place by 2015 a reliable information and communications infrastructure that shall feature high-speed connections, comprehensive regional coverage, and a 24/7 availability. Paired with increased security and the availability of electronic identification, this infrastructure shall form the basis for the provision of innovative digital services.

Moreover, in April 2009, the SADe programme was set up to serve as a national action plan for putting forward eServices and eDemocracy for the period 2009–2012. This plan is aimed at:

- providing all basic public e-services for citizens and for businesses by electronic means by 2013;
- ensuring interoperability of information systems in the public administration; and
- facilitating access to public services through a common client interface.

Within this framework, the SADe Services and Project report 2009 was published in January 2010 as an update on the programme's implementation. This report constitutes a proposal for the main plans and measures for e-services and e-administration to be followed to foster developments in the information society from 2009 to 2012.

==== Actors ====
Responsibility for e-government in Finland lies with the Ministry of Finance, which is also responsible for the public administration reform and the general Finnish ICT policy. Within the ministry, the Public Management Department is responsible for ICT policy coordination as well as for services provision and quality. Moreover, created in early 2005, the State IT Management Unit forms a part of the Public Management Department, in charge of preparing and implementing the Government's IT strategy. This unit is headed by the State IT Director who also acts as a government-wide chief information officer (CIO). Further relevant actors include:

- the Advisory Committee on Information Management in Public Administration (JUHTA, within the Ministry of Interior), responsible for coordinating the development of information technology, information management, and electronic services in the central and local government;
- the State IT Service Centre, responsible for shared IT services in public administration; and
- the Ubiquitous Information Society Advisory Board, responsible for the provision of insights on the identification of priorities for the national information society policy.

==== Infrastructure ====
The suomi.fi portal constitutes Finland's single access point to online public services offered from both state and local authorities. Launched in April 2002, the portal offers a broad spectrum of information and downloadable forms structured around daily life events. For the business community the yritysSuomi.fi portal was set up, featuring information about enterprises, linking to business related e-services within suomi.fi as well as providing access to business related legislation on Finland's official law database Finlex.

In the area of e-identification, Finland introduced the Finnish Electronic Identity card in 1999. This card enables Finnish citizens to authenticate themselves for online services and conduct electronic transactions. This card can also be used for encrypting emails and enables the use of digital signatures. Since October 2006, employees in the state administration are able to identify themselves in the public administration information systems by using a civil servant's identity card, containing a qualified certificate. (Note: For a digital certificate to be considered qualified certificate the EU has put specific requirements as included in Annex I and Annex II of the EU directive 1999/93 EC on a Community framework for electronic signatures)

With respect to e-procurement, the HILMA Notification service constitutes a platform for announcing national and EU call for tenders. Using this platform is mandatory for tenders above certain thresholds. Moreover, a further e-procurement platform is maintained by Hansel Ltd, a state-owned company acting as the central purchasing unit for the government.

=== France ===
==== Key policy events ====
The oldest track of an e-government measure in France was the nationwide release in 1984 of Minitel terminals through which citizens and companies could access several public services and information remotely. E-government first stood as a policy priority in 1998, in the framework of the strategy to prepare France to become an information society. It was in 2004 that the development of eGovernment turned into a standalone policy with the launch of both a strategic plan and an action plan commonly referred to as the ADELE programme. The latter aimed to simplify and make the public services accessible by electronic means to all users, 24 hours a day, seven days a week, as well as to cut the costs generated by the operation of the public administration. A pre-condition for this and a related objective listed in the programme was to generate trust in new ways of delivering services.

The year 2005 marked a turning point for e-government with the adoption of a government ordinance regulating and granting legal value to all aspects of the electronic exchanges (of data, information, and documents) taking place within the public administration, as well as between the public bodies and the citizens or businesses. Considered as the country's eGovernment Act, the ordinance also set the year of the advent of e-government to 2008.

Since then, the further implementation of e-government has been a shared priority of both Digital France 2012 (the plan for the development of the digital economy by 2012) and the General Review of Public Policies, a reform process which was launched in June 2007 to keep the public spending in check while refining public services in a way to centre them even more on their users' needs.

Subsequently, the digital bill or "Loi pour une République Numérique" was adopted in 2016 with the goal of regulating the digital economy as a whole through new provisions. Thus, it establishes the following principles: net neutrality, data portability, right to maintain the connection, confidentiality of private correspondence, right to be forgotten for minors, better inform consumers of online reviews, openness of public data, improved accessibility, and digital death. Moreover, new development plans of the digital economy have been launched in 2017 such as Public Action 2022 (with three main objectives related to users, public officials, and taxpayers) and Concerted Development of the Territorial Digital Administration (DCANT) 2018–2020 (which aims to build fluent and efficient digital public services by being the roadmap for regional digital transformation).

==== Major developments ====
The e-government portal service-public.fr provides citizens and businesses with a one stop shop to online government information and services that are displayed according to life-events. The 8th EU Benchmark refers to the related second generation portal, mon.service-public.fr, as one of France's biggest success stories since 2007. It is a user-customised and highly secured (via e-identification) single access point to all the public services available online, some of which are entirely transactional. A personal account enables users to keep track and know the status of all their interactions with the public administration.

According to the United Nations' 2008 worldwide e-Government Survey, the website of the French prime minister is the best of its kind in western Europe due to the fact it "has a strong e-participation presence and has features for online consultation, has a separate e-government portal and has instituted a time frame to respond to citizen's queries and e-mails." The Survey goes on: "The site also contains a number of news feeds and RSS to continuously update citizens with information from the media and blogs."

Other developments include:

- The taxation portal which enables the filing of personal income and corporate returns and the online payment of taxes;
- The country-wide e-procurement platform Marchés publics and, since 1 January 2010, the related legal right for contracting authorities to require bidders to submit their applications and tenders by electronic means only;
- The electronic social insurance card Vitale, the ePractice Good Practice Label case winner 2007;
- The possibility to notify online a change of address to several public authorities at once;
- The open data portal, data.gouv.fr, launched in December 2011, which allows public services to publish their own data;
- The Inter-Ministerial Network of the State (RIE), a shared network that carries data exchanged within each Ministry and between ministries;
- The SSO solution France Connect, launched in June 2016, which provides users (10 million users by end of 2018) with an identification mechanism recognised by all digital public services available in France, and will allow the country to implement the European Regulation eIDAS (Electronic Identification and Signature);
- The portal Démarches simplifiées, launched on 1 March 2018, aims to simplify all public services by allowing public administrations to create their own online forms.

==== Actors ====
The Ministry for the Budget, Public Accounts and Civil Service is responsible for steering the e-government policy. It shares this remit with two Inter-ministerial Directorates (created in 2017), the Inter-Ministerial Directorate of Public Transformation (DITP), which is under the authority of the Minister of State Reform and led by the inter-ministerial delegate for public transformation, and the Inter-Ministerial Directorate for Digital Affairs and State Information and Communication System (DINSIC), which is placed by the delegation of the Prime Minister, under the authority of the Minister in charge of the digital. This organisation for public and digital transformation of the State was formerly known as General Secretary for the Modernisation of Public Administration (SGMAP) from 2012 to 2017. Therefore, these two e-government actors are acting as a support for ministries and administrations in the conduct of public transformation of the State. Indeed, they coordinate the Public Action 2022 programme and lead innovative interdepartmental projects.

==== Compte Personnel de Formation (CPF) ====
The CPF, or 'personal training account', is a right for all employees to receive lifelong training in any field. It is a system that democratises access to professional training in order to make training accessible to those in need. It is a platform from the government to its citizens it can be categorised as the G2C type of e-government.

Each year, every employee can obtain up to 500 euros on their individual account. This amount is calculated based on each individual's annual working hours. According to the system an employee does not spend any money, because it is the employer who contributes to their account with a balance capped at 5000 euros as a maximum. This money cannot be withdrawn to the employee's bank account, it can only be used for training.

This system is managed by the Caisse des Dépôts, which is the public financial institution that manages various projects of the French State, such as the pension fund, social housing and Livret A savings accounts.

This system has enabled people in need to obtain additional skills to enable them to move up the corporate ladder or to focus on professional training (allows them to benefit from 150 hours of training that can be accumulated over 7 years). 38 million French people have a CPF balance, 14.8 million French people have opened their accounts, which represents 53 billion euros injected into the CPF. Another benefit of the CPF is that employees' personal independence is also promoted by the CPF, which allows them to self-manage their training hours and implement their training project. This means that the employee will no longer have to negotiate with his or her employer about training options, but only if the training takes place outside of working hours (except in the case of certain training courses).

The CPF also supports training that is not directly linked to the needs of businesses but that is required for employees and job seekers' needs and interests. Foreign language training, information, office automation, and basic knowledge can be examples. Then, the CPF allows more people to take advantage of their right to continue training throughout their professional lives while being completely self-sufficient.

Whether it is young people still studying, employees or pensioners, everyone in France receives many scam calls from companies pretending to be the CPF in order to steal the contributions of French citizens, trying to usurp identities or sell poor quality training. To do this, the call centres search for e-mail addresses or telephone numbers in bulk via Google, directories or fraudulent websites. Some employees who wish to train can no longer do so because their identity has been stolen and they will not be able to obtain the funds to obtain new skills. On the other hand, the state money allocated for this budget is being laundered through fake training organisations.

==== Taxation portal ====
The French electronic tax filing system allows individuals to use reliable and secure online software to file one's taxes electronically, using software approved by the tax authority. France has introduced a more convenient way for its citizens and businesses to submit their tax revenues online. The citizens only have to give in their personal data required for the filing process once because as the data is stored within this system the citizens can reuse their already submitted data if there are no changes to be made. This is very beneficial as it saves the citizens a lot of work and time when submitting their yearly tax reports as it is much faster to process e-file returns than paper returns. Information about the family situation, the marital status, or the yearly taxable income will be stored within the system and resort to it whenever needed. If no changes have to be made in the following years citizens can file their taxes with just three clicks.

In order to pay taxes online, the citizens need a bank account domiciled in France or in one of the 36 countries that make up the SEPA zone. They are able to pay their taxes online at www.impots.gouv.fr. The citizens can do so from their personal space, with their tax number and notice number by clicking on the green "Pay online" button accessible via the personal space connection page, or also pay with the application via smartphone.

The online payment is not a credit card payment but a very flexible direct debit formula and each citizen is granted an additional 5 days after the payment deadline to pay directly online. The amount will be debited from their bank account 10 days after the payment deadline indicated on the notice.

Citizens are informed of the date of debit when they register their payment order. If any change is needed, the amount to be paid, as well as the bank details can be adapted easily.

=== Germany ===
Germany is a federal state made up of 16 states the so-called Länder. Based upon the political structure in the country, e-government efforts follow a threefold dimension, thus focusing on federal, state, and local level. Initial efforts began already in 1998 with the MEDIA@Komm project for the development of local eGovernment solutions in selected regions.

Later on, in 2000, BundOnline2005 initiative was launched with the main target to modernise the administration by making all federal public services capable of electronic delivery by the end of 2005. This strategy, which dominated the upcoming years, was driven by the vision that the federal administration should be lined up as a modern, service-orientated enterprise offering services that should follow a user-centric approach by focusing on citizens and their needs. This initiative was successfully completed on 31 December 2005 achieving a total of more than 440 Internet services to be made available online. The detailed results of the initiative may be found in the BundOnline Final Report, published on 24 February 2006.

==== Strategy ====
Germany's current eGovernment Strategy is laid down in the eGovernment 2.0 programme. This programme is part of the more general strategic approach set out in the document Focused on the Future: Innovations for Administration concerning the overall modernisation of the Public Administration. The eGovernment 2.0 programme identifies the following four fields of action:

- Portfolio: demand-oriented expansion of the Federal Government's eGovernment services in terms of quality and quantity.
- Process chains: electronic cooperation between businesses and public administrations via a joint process chain.
- Identification: introduction of an electronic identity card and development of eID concepts.
- Communication: a secure communications infrastructure for citizens, businesses and administrations.

Several projects have been initiated to accomplish the targets set, including:

- Electronic Identity: A new electronic identity Card has been planned to be introduced in Germany on 1 November 2010. Beyond traditional identification functions the new ID card will facilitate identification of the owner via internet by utilising a microchip containing holder's data in electronic format including biometrical data (digital facial image/fingerprints). Optional digital signature functionality is also foreseen.
- De-Mail: The De-Mail system is aimed at facilitating the secure exchange of electronic documents among citizens, businesses, and public authorities via Internet.
- Public Service Number (D115): Citizens are able to use the unitary public service number 115 as a single contact point to the public administration and obtain information about public services.

In parallel to modernisation efforts focusing on the federal public administration, continuous efforts are also made to create a fully integrated eGovernment landscape in Germany throughout the federal government, federal-state governments, and municipal administrations. This objective is addressed by the Deutschland-Online initiative, a joint strategy for integrated eGovernment adopted in 2003. This strategy places particular emphasis on following priorities: Integrated eServices for citizens and businesses; Interconnection of Internet portals; Development of common infrastructures; Common standards; and Experience and knowledge transfer.

Other eGovernment related strategy include: the Federal IT strategy (adopted on 5 December 2007) aiming at improving IT management within the government, as well as the Broadband Strategy of the Federal Government (adopted on 18 February 2009) aimed at providing businesses and household with high end broadband services by 2014.

==== Legislation ====
The legal basis for e-government in Germany is set by a framework of laws regulating key aspects of e-government (and of the information society in general) such as: Freedom of Information Legislation (Freedom of information Act); Data Protection (Federal Data Protection Act); eSignatures related legislation (Digital Signature Act); and legislation regarding the re-use of public sector information (Law on re-use of Public Sector Information).

=== Greece ===
==== Brief history ====
Initial action towards e-government in Greece took place in 1994 with the Kleisthenis programme, which introduced new technologies in the public sector. SYZEFXIS, the National Network of Public Administration, was launched in 2001 and progressively was connected to the Hellenic Network for Research and Technology (GRNET) and to the EU-wide secure network TESTA. From 2000 to 2009 several projects were launched, such as ARIADNI, which addressed the evaluation, simplification, and digitisation of the administrative procedures, POLITEIA, which re-established the real needs of the public administration, and Taxisnet which offered the citizens online tax and custom services that include the administration of VAT and VIES declarations, income tax declaration, vehicle registration, etc. In 2009, the National Portal of Public Administration, HERMES, ensured the safe transaction of public information. Since the introduction of the national Digital Strategy 2006–2013 which entered its second phase in 2009, Greece has also shown progress in the field of information and communication technologies. The Greek e-Government Interoperability Framework (Greek e-GIF) places among the overall design of the Greek public administration for the provision of e-government services to public bodies, businesses and citizens. It is the cornerstone of Digital Strategy 2006–2013 for the transition and adjustment of the requirements of modern times and is directly related to the objectives and direction of European policy 2010 – European Information Society 2010. The Electronic Government framework aims to support effective e-government at the central, regional and local level and contribute to achieving interoperability at the level of information systems, procedures and data.

==== Strategy ====
The white paper published in 1999 and updated in 2002 emphasised the need for quality of public services. A new strategic plan, the Digital Strategy 2006–2013, was adapted to map the national digital course. The plan did not focus on specific projects per each organisation; its purpose was the improvement of the productivity of Greek economy and the quality of citizen's life. According to the National Strategic Reference Framework for 2007–2013 the organisation of the public administration is aimed to be improved through the operational programme Public Administration Reform.

==== Legislation ====
The Greek Constitution guarantees the fundamental principles of the right to access information (relevant law is No. 2690/1999), the participation of everyone to the information society, the obligation of the state to reply to citizen requests for information in a timely fashion. The state operations on e-government are audited by the Hellenic Court of Auditors.

Further legal entities that have been adopted are the following:

- Law 2472/1997 on the Protection of Individuals with regard to the Processing of Personal Data: it protects the citizens' right to privacy
- Telecommunications Law 2867/2000: it controls e-communications
- Presidential Decrees (59, 60, 118/2007): they make simpler the public procurement procedures and establish an e-procurement process.

==== Actors ====
The Ministry of the Interior is in charge of e-government in Greece, and more specifically, the General Secretariat for Public Administration and eGovernment. Also, the Special Secretariat of Digital Planning, Ministry of Economy and Finance, has as its main task to implement the overall information society strategy.

=== Hungary ===
Hungary's e-government policies for the period 2008–2010 are displayed in the E-public administration 2010 Strategy document. This strategy aims to define the future Hungarian e-administration and set the necessary uniform infrastructure for the implementation of its future objectives, focused on four primary domains:

- Modern e-services for all interaction between the citizens, businesses and the public administration.
- Services that will render interaction with the public administration more effective and transparent.
- Dissemination of e-government knowledge.
- More adaptable e-government for disadvantaged businesses and social groups.

Despite the lack of e-government specific legislation, the e-government landscape is created through the following legal framework adopted in the period 2004–2009:

- Government Decree 229/2008 (IX.12.) on the customer protection related quality requirements of electronic communication services.
- Government Decree 80/2008 (IV.4.) on electronic application submission related to agricultural and rural development supports.
- Decree of the Ministry of Justice 27/2008 (XII.10.) on detailed rules of the operation of electronic public procurement system.
- Government resolution 1007/2008 (II.19.) on the government commissioner in charge of IT in the administration.
- Government resolution 29/2008 (II.19.) on the minister leading the Prime Minister's Office.
- Government resolution 182/2007 (VII.10.) on the Central Electronic Service System.
- Government decree 84/2007 (IV.25.) on the security requirements of the Central Electronic Service System and the related systems.
- Government decree 276/2006 (XII.23.) on the public administration and Central Electronic Public Services Office.
- Common regulation of the Ministry of Finance, the Ministry of Informatics and Communication and the Minister in charge of the Prime Minister's Office 13/2006 (IV.28.) on the return and the obligation of data submission by electronic means.
- Government decree 335/2005 (XII.29.) on the common provisions of the document management in public administrative bodies.
- Government decree 195/2005 (IX.22.) on security criteria of information systems used for electronic administration.
- Government Decree 194/2005 (IX.22.) on the requirements of electronic signatures and certificates used in (actions of) public administration and Certification Service Providers issuing those certificates.
- Government decree 193/2005 (IX.22.) on detailed provisions regarding electronic administration.
- Act No. CXL. of 2004 on general rules regarding to the administrative procedures and services.
- Government decree 184/2004 (VI.3.) on electronic public administration and related services.
- Government resolution 1188/2002 (XI.7.) on the Electronic Government Backbone and the Common Informatics Network.
- Decree of the Ministry of Economy and Transport 114/2007 (XII.29.) on the rules of digital archiving.
- Act No. CXI. of 2008 on the general rules of procedures and services of administrative authorities.
- Government decree 1058/2008 (IX.9.) on the programme of the government for reducing of the administrative burden of market and non-market actors as well as simplifying and accelerating the procedures.
- Government decree 2055/2008. (V.9.) on the tasks arising from the implementation of the Directive on services in the internal market 2006/123/EC.
- Act No. LX. of 2009 on electronic public services.

The bodies responsible for laying down the e-government policies and strategies are the Senior State Secretariat for Info-communication (SSSI) and the State Secretariat for ICT and eGovernment (SSIeG) together with the Committee for IT in the Administration (KIB). In parallel, they are also in charge of coordination, the implementation of those policies and strategies, and the provision of the related support.

The main e-government portal is Magyarorszag.hu (Hungary.hu), which serves as a services platform. Due to the gateway Client Gate the portal has become fully transactional. Another important infrastructure component is the Electronic Government Backbone (EKG), which is a safe nationwide broadband network linking 18 county seats, with the capital Budapest providing the central administration and regional bodies with a secure and monitored infrastructure, enhancing data and information exchange, Internet access and public administration internal network services.

=== Ireland ===
The use of information technology to support organisational change has been high on Ireland's government modernisation agenda since the mid '90s. Similarly, the information society development policy – launched during the same decade – targeted among other goals the electronic delivery of government services. Three strands of electronic service delivery development were followed, namely: information services; transactional services; and integrated services. The latter stage was reached with the so-called "Public Service Broker", an information system acting as an intermediary between the public administration and its customers. This system has been supporting the single and secured access to central and local government services for citizens and businesses, via various type of channels (online, by phone, or in regular offices).

The year 2008 stands as a turning point in terms of governance due to the adoption of the Transforming Public Services Programme, which rethinks and streamlines the eGovernment policy, in an aim to enhance the efficiency and the consistency of the work of the public administration while centring it around the citizens' needs. The approach opted for is that of a rolling programme that is determined by the Department of Finance and assessed bi-annually. The development of shared services and the support to smaller public administration bodies are among the core elements of the new deal.

==== Major projects ====
The Irish government seems to be effectively delivering on its policy commitments. "Irish citizens feel positive about the effectiveness of their government at working together to meet the needs of citizens". So reveals the report Leadership in Customer Service: Creating Shared Responsibility for Better Outcomes which is based on a citizen satisfaction survey conducted in 21 countries worldwide. As for the 8th EU Benchmark of 2009, it notes a "strong growth" in Ireland's eGovernment policy performance, in particular in terms of online availability and sophistication of its public services, as well as positive user experience which is estimated to be "above the EU average".

Flagship projects include:

- The "Revenue Online Service" (ROS), enabling the online and secured payment of tax-related transactions by businesses and the self-employed.
- The "PAYE Anytime" service for employees.
- The "Citizen Information Website" – a life-event structured portal informing citizens on everything they need to know about government services (eGovernment prize winner at the World Summit Award 2007)
- "BASIS", the eGovernment portal for businesses, a single access point to the administrative formalities related to creating, running and closing down a business.
- Motor Tax online – website that allows motorists to pay motor tax online.
- The "South Dublin Digital Books" service (Finalist project in the 2009 edition of the European eGovernment Awards)
- The popular public procurement portal "eTenders".
- The "Certificates.ie" service, enabling the online booking and payment of marriage, birth and death certificates.
- The "Acts of the Oireachtas" web portal – a bilingual specificity, featuring national legislation texts in both Irish and English.

=== Italy ===
==== Key policy events ====
In Italy, e-government first became a policy priority in 2000, with the adoption of a two-year action plan. Since then, a combination of legal and policy steps have been taken to further computerise, simplify, and modernise the public administration management and services while enhancing their quality and cost efficiency. Increased user-friendliness and more transparent governance are major goals of the current eGovernment plan, the E-Government Plan 2012. In this light, a specific website allows those interested to know of the progress status of the plan's implementation.

The adoption in 2005 of the eGovernment Code, a legal act entirely dedicated to eGovernment, provided the required legal support for enabling the consistent development of eGovernment. Among other aspects, the code regulates:

- the availability of public electronic services,
- the electronic exchange of information within the public administration and between the latter and the citizens,
- online payments, and
- the use of e-identification.

==== Major developments ====
The central public eProcurement portal MEPA, the eMarketplace of the public administration, is a European best practice; it indeed won the European eGovernment Award 2009 in the category "eGovernment empowering businesses". Angela Russo describes: "It is a virtual market in which any public administration (PA) can buy goods and services, below the European threshold, offered by suppliers qualified according to non restrictive selection criteria. The entire process is digital, using digital signatures to ensure transparency of the process."

The Italian electronic identity card grants access to secured eGovernment services requiring electronic identification, and the possibility to perform related online transactions. Strictly for electronic use, the National Services Card (CNS – Carta Nazionale dei Servizi in Italian) also exists. This is a personal smart card for accessing G2C services and is lacking the visual security characteristics, e.g., holograms, being otherwise similar to the eID card in terms of hardware and software. The CNS card can be used both as a proof of identity and to digitally sign electronic documents.

According to the 8th EU Benchmark, as far as public eServices delivery is concerned, Italy scores high with 70% on one stop shop approach and 75% on user-focused portal design. Two comprehensive, online, single entry points to public services have been made available to citizens and businesses respectively. Both portals are clearly structured around the needs of their users and include transactional services. The portal for businesses goes further in removing the burdens resting on Italian companies and entrepreneurs; it provides a secure and personalised services suite provided by various public authorities.

Other developments include the taxation portal, which enables the filing of personal income and corporate returns and the online payment of taxes, and Magellano, a nationwide government knowledge management platform.

==== Actors ====
The Ministry of Public Administration and Innovation and in particular its department for the Digitisation of Public Administration holds political responsibility for e-government. It benefits from the assistance of the Standing Committee on Technological Innovation which provides expert advice on how to best devise the country's e-government policy. The implementation of national e-government initiatives is ensured by the responsible agency, namely the National Agency for Digital Administration (CNIPA) and the relevant Central Government Departments. The Italian Regions determine their respective e-government action plans with the technical support of CNIPA. The department for the Digitisation of Public Administration is the safeguard of the consistency of the policies that are carried out at the various levels of government.

=== Latvia ===
A milestone in the e-government evolution in Latvia was the approval of the Declaration of the Intended Activities of the Cabinet of Ministers on 1 December 2004. This document defined the goals, strategy, and process for eGovernment in the country; it also defined the roles and responsibilities of the minister responsible for eGovernment. At the same time, the Secretariat of the Special Assignments Minister for Electronic Government Affairs was established to be in charge of the implementation of e-government.

The Better governance: administration quality and efficiency document set out the framework for the development of the local government information systems in the period 2009–2013. In July 2006, the Latvian Information Society Development Guidelines (2006–2013) were launched, which according to the Special Assignments Minister for Electronic Government Affairs aimed to:

...increase Latvia's competitiveness, contributing to a well-balanced development of the Information Society, which [would] consequently lead to a society that [would] know how to acquire and use the relevant information and know-how in achieving higher living standards.

The Latvian eGovernment Development Programme 2005–2009 presented the national eGovernment strategy adopted by the government in September 2005. This programme was based on Latvia's eGovernment Conception and on the Public Administration Reform Strategy 2001–2006. The national programme Development and Improvement of eGovernment Infrastructure Base was adopted on 1 September 2004.

==== Legislation ====
The state- and local-government owned information systems in Latvia and the information services they provide are operating according to the State Information Systems Law (adopted in May 2002 and amended several times until 2008). This law addresses intergovernmental cooperation, information availability, and information quality.

==== Key actors ====
On 1 June 2009, the Ministry of Regional Development and Local Government took over the tasks of the Secretariat of Special Assignments Minister for Electronic Government Affairs and became responsible for information society and e-government policy development, implementation, and coordination.

Decentralised development is regulated by the State Regional Development Agency (SRDA) at the national level. Supervised by the Ministry of Regional Development and Local Government, SRDA runs the programmes of state support and the activities of the European Union Structural Funds.

=== Lithuania ===
Lithuania, through the Action Plan of the Lithuanian Government Programme for 2008–2012 has made quick steps towards e-government. The action plan includes in its goals the modernisation of the entire public administration to satisfy the needs of Lithuanian society, providing efficient services to both citizens and businesses. It also considers attaining an equilibrium of the services offered in urban and rural areas (especially regarding remote rural areas); the maintenance of a strong legal framework that would support the ICT market and a secure personal electronic identification and authentication. The enabling factors for these goals is the rapid development of public sector's eServices and the use of ICT infrastructure for the effective operation of service centres.

==== Major developments ====
Lithuania has demonstrated a significant progress in e-government through a highly developed legal framework protecting and supporting with various laws the e-government fields, and an e-government infrastructure offering on a daily basis pertinent information and a variety of services to the Lithuanian citizens and businesses. The legal framework comprises legislation on e-government, the freedom of information, data protection and privacy, e-commerce, e-communications, e-signatures and e-procurement. The e-government infrastructure includes the e-government gateway (Lithuanian eGovernment portal) offering several e-services on a wide range of topics including:

- Electronic order of certificate of conviction (non-conviction).
- Information on a citizen's State Social Insurance.
- The provision of medical services and drug subscriptions.
- Certificate on personal data, stored at the Register of Citizens.
- Certificate on declared place of residence.

In addition, Lithuania has developed the Secure State Data Communication Network (SSDCN) (a nationwide network of secure communication services), electronic identity cards (issued on 1 January 2009), an eSignature back office infrastructure, the Central Public Procurement portal and the Network of Public Internet Access Points (PIAPs).

==== Actors ====
The Ministry of the Interior lays down the national e-government policies and strategies, while the Information Policy Department of the Ministry of the Interior and the Information Society Development Committee under the Government of the Republic of Lithuania share the responsibility for coordination and for the implementation of relevant e-government projects.

=== Luxembourg ===
During the 2000s, Luxembourg has highly progressed in the area of e-government. It has clearly developed its e-government infrastructure and has expanded its network of services to better satisfy the needs of the citizens and businesses of Luxembourg.

In February 2001, the "eLuxembourg Action Plan" establishes eGovernment as one of its primary axes. A few years later, in July 2005, a new "eGovernment Master Plan" has been elaborated to boost eGovernment development in the country. During that period, new portals have been launched, including:

- Portal dedicated to primary education needs (January 2006)
- Public Procurement portal (February 2006)
- Business portal (June 2006)
- "Emergency" portal (July 2006)
- Thematic portal of Sports (December 2007)
- "eGo" electronic payment system (September 2008)
- "De Guichet" portal (November 2008)
- "eLuxemburgensia" portal (May 2009)
- Anelo.lu portal (October 2009)

This new "eGovernment Master Plan" aims to define and set a framework for the expanded use of new technologies for Luxembourg. That framework comprises the following domains:

- Organisation and Management
- Contents and Services
- Education and Training
- Technologies and Infrastructure
- Security and Privacy
- Legislative Framework

The Ministry of the Civil Service and Administrative Reform determines the policy and strategy in eGovernment, and is also responsible for coordination. The merge of the State Computer Centre (CIE) and of the eLuxembourg Service (SEL) has formed a new eGovernment service, the State Information Technology Centre (CTIE). This service has been created to fully cover the needs of public administrations' electronic exchanges in Luxembourg and also to keep pace with the developments of a constantly evolving information society. CTIE is responsible for the coordination and implementation of eGovernment services, in addition to providing the necessary support to public administration bodies.

The www.luxembourg.lu portal constitutes the country's main eGovernment point of contact offering important information on Luxembourg. The constitution of a Single Central Government Portal is anticipated for, joining the existing "De Guichet" and the "Business" portals with the aim to provide even more pertinent and transparent services.

=== Malta ===
Malta has progressed in the eGovernment sector concentrating its efforts to further develop existing and new eGovernment infrastructure and services.

Among other, several portals and services have been launched since 2002:

- Customer Service website and Internet Phone Box service (November 2002)
- e-Identity system (March 2004)
- Online payment system (August 2004)
- Data Protection portal and eHealth portal (February 2006)
- National eTourism portal (January 2006)
- eVAT service and mygov.mt: a state portal (September 2007)
- online Customer Care system (May 2009)
- Portal for Local councils (June 2009)
- Judicial portal (October 2009)

The Malta Information Technology Agency (MITA) is the central administration responsible for the implementation of the eGovernment strategy in Malta. The official e-government strategy of Malta has been drafted in "White Paper on the Vision and Strategy for the Attainment of eGovernment" (2001). Currently, Malta's eGovernment Programme is based upon the evolved "Smart Island Strategy (2008–2010)", and more precisely, on one of its seven streams, the "Reinventing Government" stream. The current eGovernment strategy in Malta focuses on:

- creating and operating an e-government platform;
  - using open technologies; and,
  - establishing one point of contact for public eservices;
- developing and offering an e-procurement system;
- informing the related communities, at European and local levels, on the electronic submission of tenders;
- conceiving a policy framework; and
- implementing a mechanism for "over-the-counter" public services for physical and legal trusted entities.

Regarding national legislation, the National ICT Strategy 2008–2010 provides for the establishment of an e-government legislation on electronic filing, computer accessibility for disabled persons and on the legal framework governing the use of e-identification (Smart ID cards) etc.

==== Main actors ====
The main e-government actors of Malta are the Ministry for Infrastructure, Transport and Communication (MITC) responsible for e-government strategy and policies, and the Malta Information Technology Agency (MITA) responsible for implementation and support.

The Maltese e-government Customer Care system and the Vehicle Registration and Licensing system were awarded the "Good Practice" label. Malta's IR Services Online and the Malta Environment Planning Authority (MEPA) e-Applications were nominated for the European eGovernment Awards.

=== Netherlands ===
The Netherlands lay special stress on the provision of an effective ICT infrastructure and related services, easily accessible by all its citizens, to reduce red tape for citizens and businesses and facilitate their communication with the Dutch public administration.

In May 2008, the government published the National ICT Agenda 2008–2011 that set its objectives in five primary areas:

- E-skills
- E-government
- Interoperability and standards
- ICT and Public domains
- Services innovation and ICT

The National Implementation Programme (NUP) became the Netherlands' eGovernment strategy until 2011, focusing on the infrastructure and relevant projects that use such infrastructure.

The main infrastructure components provide citizens, businesses, and public administrations with access to a considerable amount of information and services. In addition, a series of other e-services covering various fields is provided:

- eIdentification and eAuthentication.
- Common Authorisation and Representation Facility (Unique numbers for individuals and businesses : Citizen Service Number (CSN), Chamber of Commerce number (CCN)).

In the international stand, the Netherlands have earned the fifth position in the UN's e-Government Survey (2008) and has been rated seventh in the eReadiness climax of the Economist Intelligence Unit (2008). Considerable progress has furthermore been observed in e-government, according to the Capgemini 2007 report where online availability has raised by 10% from 2006 to 2007, reaching 63%, while a strong 54% of the Dutch use the Internet services provided in their interaction with the public administration.

E-government in the Netherlands is regulated by a set of laws covering a broad range of fields, namely, Freedom of Information Legislation (Government Information (Public Access) Act (1991)), Data Protection / Privacy Legislation (Personal Data Protection Act (2000)), eCommerce Legislation (eCommerce Act (2004)), eCommunications Legislation (Telecommunications Act (2004)), eSignatures Legislation (Electronic Signature Act (2003)).

The body responsible for laying down the eGovernment policies and strategies is the Ministry of the Interior and Kingdom Relations, whereas the coordination of those policies/strategies is shared between the competent Ministry and the Services and e-government Management Committee (SeGMC). The implementation of the eGovernment policies is undertaken by the ICTU foundation and the agency Logius.

=== Poland ===
Poland has taken significant steps towards the development of an e-government framework that aims to define the rights and obligations of both citizens and businesses, every time they interact with the public sector through the use of electronic means.

The following list comprises key documents regarding the e-government strategy of Poland:

- The Computerisation Development Strategy of Poland until 2013 and Perspectives for the Information Society Transformation by 2020 sets out the framework for the development of Poland's Information Society.
- The National Computerisation Plan for the period 2007–2010 describes the tasks that need to be implemented by public bodies regarding the development of Information Society and the provision of electronic services.
- The Strategy for the Development of the Information Society in Poland until 2013.

Poland bases its e-government legislation on the Act on the Computerisation of the Operations of the Entities Performing Public Tasks, which sets out the rights for citizens and businesses to contact the public authorities electronically.

The Ministry of Interior and Administration is responsible for carrying out the national e-government policy. The Ministry of Infrastructure is in charge of the design and implementation of Poland's telecommunication policy and broadband strategy. The Committee for Computerisation and Communications of the Council of Ministers is tasked with the coordination and monitoring of the implementation of the National Computerisation Plan for the period 2007–2010.

=== Portugal ===
The Portuguese Government has achieved significant progress in the area of e-government as part of the Technological Plan in an attempt to develop information society and render Portugal more competitive among its European counterparts and in the international stand.

The action plan Connecting Portugal ("LigarPortugal") has aimed to implement the information technology section of the Technological Plan. Its main objectives have focused on:

- promoting a conscious and active citizenship;
- guaranteeing a telecommunications' competitive environment in the Portuguese market;
- ensuring transparency in any interaction with the Public Administration;
- fostering the extensive use of ICT in the business sector; and
- technological and scientific growth through research.

The Simplex programme comprises a well-developed Administrative and Legislative Simplification Programme which is dedicated to diminishing bureaucracy, enhancing transparency in interactions with the State and efficiency in public administration's operations, thus gaining the trust of the Portuguese people. In 2017 the Justiça.gov.pt portal was launched, In 2019 the "ePortugal" portal was launched, replacing the older 'Portal do Cidadão' that was active since 2004.

==== Legislation ====
Even though no e-government legislation exists as a whole, the Resolution of Cabinet no. 137/2005, of 17 August, foresees the adoption of a legal system for Public Administration bodies and services.

The Minister for the Presidency is in charge of e-government in Portugal. Together with the Secretary of State for Administrative Modernisation and the Agency for the Public Services Modernisation (AMA) define the e-government policies and strategies. AMA is also responsible for coordination, a task that it shares with the National Coordinator for the Lisbon Strategy and the Technological Plan. AMA and the Government Network Management Centre (CEGER) have undertaken the task of implementing these policies and strategies.

==== Infrastructure ====
Portugal has an advanced e-government infrastructure containing two major portals; the Citizen's portal and the Enterprise's portal. Both are considered as main access points for interaction with the public administration. Three extent e-government networks constitute another important part of the Portuguese e-Government infrastructure: the Electronic Government Network managed by CEGER, the Common Knowledge Network which is a portal that connects central and local public bodies, businesses and citizens and the Solidarity Network which comprises 240 broadband access points and is dedicated to the elderly and the disabled.

E-identification is another sector in which Portugal has significantly advanced. The Citizen's Card was launched, an electronic identity card containing biometric features and electronic signatures. In addition, Portugal has issued the Portuguese Electronic Passport (PEP), which includes the personal details of a holder (as in the traditional passport) and a set of mechanisms encompassing features varying from facial recognition to the incorporation of a chip.

The national e-procurement portal, which is currently merely an information tool, is destined to become the central procurement mechanism for the entire Portuguese public administration.

In order to enhance the use of e-Government services in the country, the Portuguese government operates a network of offices across the country called Citizen's Space (Portuguese: Espaço de Cidadão) which mainly offers help in granting access and guidance to various electronic governmental services.

Other considerable infrastructure initiatives that have taken place are:

- CITIUS, which enables the electronic submission of documents for court use.
- Simplified Business Information (IES), made for businesses to electronically submit declarations, namely, accounts, tax returns and statistics.
- PORBASE, the National Bibliographic Database comprising more than 1,300,000 bibliographic records.
- e-Accessibility, a good practice unit focusing on accessibility to public administration by the elderly and the disabled.
- Portuguese Electronic Vote Project, whose aim is to enable citizens to exercise their voting right even if they are away from their designated voting area.
- Digital Cities and Digital Regions, a set of over 25 projects offering electronic solutions for local public administrations, e-Services for citizens and improved conditions for the development and blossoming of SMEs.
- Public Internet Spaces, for free computer access for all citizens.
- National GRID initiative, fostering the development of grid computing and combining computer resources for the resolution of complex scientific, technical or business problems that require large amount of data to be processed.

=== Romania ===
In 2008, the responsible body for eGovernment, the Agency for Information Society Services, (ASSI) published its strategy, mainly focusing on improving the efficiency of public administration services and more precisely, on providing access to interested stakeholders (citizens and businesses). It thus became the main provider of ICT services ensuring data reusability among the public administration bodies. The utmost objectives of this strategy were to enhance efficiency, transparency, accessibility and in addition to diminish red tape and illegal activities.

The Romanian Government has also laid stress on setting a legal framework that would foster the information society and, by extension, e-government. This framework included the Government Decision No. 1085/2003 on the application of certain provisions of law No. 161/2003, on measures ensuring transparency in all interaction with the public administration, the prevention and prosecution of illegal activities and the implementation of the National Electronic System (NES).

The Romanian e-government infrastructure is based upon the main e-government portal that provides a single point of contact to public services at national and local levels, incorporating a transactional platform. Furthermore, NES serves as a single point of access to e-services and has been developed in parallel with the portal to operate as a data interchange Centre and ensure interoperability with back-end systems across public administration. All citizens and businesses have access to the portal and to public agencies' services through NES. Regarding e-identification and e-authentication, the National Person Identity System is in progress aiming at creating a computerised record of civil status for all citizens. This project also includes the following e-identity sections:

- the Civil Information System,
- the Identity Card System,
- the Passport system,
- the Driving Licence and the Car Registration system, and
- the Personal Record system.

One infrastructure component is the e-procurement system e-licitatie.ro whose main purpose is to improve control mechanisms in procurement procedures while fostering transparency, facilitating access to public contracts, and diminishing red tape.

The Ministry of Communications and Information Society (MCSI) is the body responsible for defining the e-government policies and strategies and together with the Agency for the Information Society Services (ASSI) and other subordinate bodies co-ordinate the implementation of the eGovernment strategy which is done through private sector subcontractors.

Dan Nica, Minister for Information Society in Romania states in an interview that Romania has started the ambitious project of aligning itself to the latest trends in e-government and introducing the most advanced electronic systems in providing public services to its citizens. He also mentioned that with this process there will be some reshaping in the administrative procedures based on individual life-events. The Minister speaks about upcoming projects such as Online Issuance of Civil Status Documents and the e-Agricultural Registry.

=== Slovakia ===
==== Brief history ====
The initial framework for the development of information systems of public authorities in Slovakia was set in 1995 with the Act No. 261/1995 on State Information Systems (SIS). According to eEurope+ Final Progress Report, in 2001 over 80% of the online government services were in the planning stage. Based on the same source, by 2003 this proportion was reduced to 34% and the services that posted online information increased from 2% to 24%. The National Public Administration portal was launched in 2003. Aiming to have online 20 public services by 2013, the Operational Programme of Introducing IT into Society (OPIS) was approved in 2007.

==== Strategy ====
The main Slovak e-government plan is the Strategy for Building an Information Society in the Slovak Republic and Action Plan. The Plan was adopted in 2004 setting thus the national e-government strategic objectives. Several strategic e-government documents were adopted between 2001 and 2006. In 2009 with the document Information Society Strategy from 2009–2013 Slovakia presented an updated strategy for the national information society. The new trends in ICT were included in the new document replacing thus the original Information Society Strategy with the Action Plan.

==== Legislation ====
According to the Act No. 275/2006 on Public Administration Information Systems (20 April 2006) a framework has been developed for the information systems of public authorities. The Act has been amended in 2009. Relevant laws have been implemented regarding the freedom of information, data protection, e-commerce, e-communications, e-signatures, e-procurement and the re-use of public sector information (PSI).

==== Actors ====
The Ministry of Finance is the main governmental body responsible for the Information Society and the building of a National eGovernment Concept of Public Administration. The ministry acts under the authority for the Operational Programme Informatisation of Society.

At regional and local authorities the public administration is executed by self-government; the Ministry of Interior is responsible for the coordination.

Other governmental bodies are:

- the Government Plenipotentiary for the Information Society
- the Social Insurance Agency
- the Supreme Audit Office
- the Office for Personal Data Protection
- the National Security Authority

=== Slovenia ===
==== Brief history ====
In 1993 the Government Centre for Informatics (GCI) was established (Official Gazette of the Republic of Slovenia, No. 4/93). Between the years 2001 and 2004 the Electronic Commerce and Electronic Signature Act were passed along with the Strategy of eCommerce in Public Administration. Since 2001, the governmental portal, e-Uprava, and other portals offer information and electronic services. The results are visible and encourage further work in this area. After the adoption of the eEurope Action Plan in 2002, Slovenia has risen to second position in the European Commission's eServices sector in 2007 in terms of the most developed internet-based administrative services.

The main strategic documents that comprise Slovenia's strategy include the National Development Strategy adopted in 2005, the eGovernment Strategy of the Republic of Slovenia for the period 2006 to 2010 adopted in 2006, the Action Plan for eGovernment for the period 2006 to 2010 adopted in 2007, the Strategy on IT and electronic services development and connection of official records (SREP), and the Strategy for the development of the Information Society in the Republic of Slovenia until 2010 (si2010), adopted in 2007.

The main infrastructure components of Slovenian e-government are:

- The e-government portal, e-Uprava, a tool for all the visitors interested in gaining knowledge on Slovenia, and information regarding the public administration and the private sector. It offers information and electronic services with visible results encouraging thus further work in this area.
- The eVEM portal scoping to government to business (G2B) and government to government (G2G) set up in 2005 to serve independent entrepreneurs in providing online the requisite tax data. The portal received international recognition at the United Nations Public Service Awards 2007, ranking second among other European countries applications.
- The e-SJU portal ("electronic services of Public Administration") that aims to make most administrative forms available in electronic form.
- eVŠ (portal for attending Slovenia's higher education) – In 2012 Ministry of Education, Science, and Sport of Slovenia developed a website named eVŠ with the main purpose of efficiently facilitating the monitoring process of the educational system's operations that are taken by the HEI and individuals. The main goals have been increasing the internationalization of Slovenian HE on a global scale and simplifying the enrolment process and administrative procedures for long-term international students. This e-system has brought many benefits, but not equally for both parties involved, where the majority of them have gone towards the stakeholders of the HEIs rather than towards candidates and future students. eVS offers to create a profile in various ways (one-time password, username, and password, institution login, etc.) which allows the creation of an enrollment application for candidates from foreign countries along with it a recognition of their foreign education for the purposes of the HEI to check whether a candidate's education meets the general and specific enrolment criteria of a certain HE study program. After the enrollment application is filed, it is clearly stated that it should be printed, signed, and sent to the address of the related university due date mentioned as well. Candidates have the possibility to change the enrollment application till the end of the application period. eVS for the HEI stakeholder offers data collection on an individual level using Slovene personal identification number (so-called EMŠO) from the students, mostly for self-evaluation and monitoring of the quality of teaching (preparation and implementation of study programs). Having a look into the statistical data of the number of enrollments, faculties choices, and programs to check the functioning of the operating system itself. However, the system has been facing some problems and challenges which are also proven by some members of our team as well. For instance, the system even though it offers its service in two languages, Slovenian and English, however not all pages and links are available or translated into English, making foreign candidates that do not understand Slovenian fluently use google translate or other translation resources which may lead to bad translations, confusion in following the instructions of application and more. Another important problem worth mentioning, is the low system responsiveness, loading of pages and links especially during the periods of application, and also difficulties of using the profiles created. Candidates who like to login again in to their profiles, cannot access with the same login access as they initially did or for example, if someone forgot their password and tries to login via the "forgot password?" link, the whole page crashes.

==== Legislation ====
Currently there is no e-government legislation in Slovenia. The General Administrative Procedure Act which was adopted in 1999 forms the basis for all administrative proceedings.

==== Actors ====
The responsibility for the Slovenian e-government strategy lies with the Minister for Public Administration. The Directorate for e-Government and Administrative Processes at the Ministry of Public Administration is the body in charge for conducting the related tasks. The Information Commissioner body, established from the merging of the Commissioner for Access to Public Information and the Inspectorate for Personal Data Protection, is functional since 2006 performing duties regarding the access to public information.

==== Recent developments ====
The main eGovernment portal in Slovenia eUprava was renewed in 2015. It received a complete redesign of the system architecture as well as of the user experience. It followed the principles of modern website design – simplicity, responsiveness and user-centricity. Citizens can access around 250 government services through the portal, as well as their personal data from various public record. In 2017, another addition to the Slovenian eGovernment infrastructure was made with the launch of eZdravje (eHealth), described as a "One Stop Shop for eHealth". Users can use the portal to their data in different eHealth databases, review their prescribed and dispensed medication, check information on waiting times and gain electronically issued referrals to specialized doctors.

=== Spain ===
==== Brief history ====
Initial steps towards a Spanish e-government policy were taken in 1999 and 2001 under the "Initiative XXI for the development of the Information Society". The formal start of a genuine policy in the field was marked by the "Shock Plan for the development of eGovernment" of May 2003. More than two years later, a plan named "Avanza" was adopted with the purpose of fully developing the country's information society to high level and following the European Union's relevant policy orientations. The main targets of the first (2006–2008) and the second phase (2009–2012) of the plan were the modernisation of the public administrations and the improvement of the citizens' well-being through the use of information and communication technology. In addition, the improvement of both the quality of and access to electronic public services has been a constant policy vector.

The adoption of the Law on Citizens' Electronic Access to Public Services (2007) solidly anchored e-government in Spain by turning it into a legal right. This law primarily lays down a right for citizens to deal with the public administrations by electronic means, at any time and place, as well as a deriving obligation for public bodies to make this possible by 31 December 2009.

==== Fundamental principles and rights ====
The Law on Citizens' Electronic Access to Public Services provides:

- Technological neutrality: the public administrations and the citizens alike are free to decide which technological option they wish to take.
- The "availability, accessibility, integrity, authenticity, confidentiality and conservation" of the data that is exchanged between the public administration and the citizens and businesses, as well as among public administrations.
- The provision by the citizens and businesses of the same data only once; public administrations must seek the needed information through their interconnections and not request this information again.
- The public administrations may access personal data within the limitations of the Law on the Protection of Personal Data of 1999.
- The right of citizens to follow up on their administrative file and to obtain an electronic excerpt of it.
- Any electronic signature used by a citizen/a legal entity is receivable by the public administration if it complies with the provisions of the Law on Electronic Signature of 2003.
- Publication of an electronic official journal.
- An eGovernment ombudsman will oversee and guarantee the respect of the eGovernment rights.

==== Major developments ====
Spain is one of the few European Union members states to have published a legal act entirely dedicated to e-government. It is also one of the few countries worldwide proposing an electronic identity card to its citizens. The DNIe, as it is called in Spain, enables a secure, easy, and quick access to a wealth of public web services requiring authentication and high levels of security to be delivered. The Spanish government is actively promoting the use of the over 14 million DNIe cards in circulation through massive awareness raising campaigns and the free allocation of hundreds of thousands of card readers.

The Spanish government operates the single web access point to online public services for citizens and companies alike: the "060.es" portal. Structured around its users' needs, it links to over 1200 public services provided by central and regional administrations. The portal is easy to use, highly interactive and user-customisable. The "060.es" portal forms part of a larger "060 Network", a network of different channels to government services delivery also comprising a phone line and offices disseminated over the entire territory.

Other major developments include:

- ePractice Best Practice Label winner @firma, a multi-PKI Validation Platform for electronic identification and electronic signature services.
- A centralised public electronic procurement portal.
- The Avanza Local Solutions platform to assist local government in delivering their public services online.

==== Actors ====
It is the Ministry of the Presidency – in particular its Directorate General for the Promotion of eGovernment Development – who devises the national e-government policy and oversees its implementation by the respective ministries. Because the Ministry of Industry, Tourism and Trade steers the aforementioned "Avanza" Plan, both ministries collaborate closely on e-government matters. The Higher Council for eGovernment ensures preparatory work and the Advisory Council of eGovernment provides the responsible ministry with expert advice. At sub-national level, the autonomous communities and the municipalities design and manage their own eGovernment initiatives.

=== Sweden ===
==== Key political events ====
The early days of e-government in Sweden date back to 1997, with the introduction of a project named "Government e-Link", which was aiming to enable the secure electronic information exchange within the public administration, as well as between public bodies and the citizens and entrepreneurs. The year 2000 can however be considered as the kick-off year of a full-fledged eGovernment policy. It is indeed on that year that the so-called "24/7 Agency" concept was introduced as a guiding principle for the Networked Public Administration. From then on, the administration as well as the services it provides had to be made reachable at any time and place, through the combined use of three media: the Internet, phone lines and regular offices. The system was resting on the relative autonomy that the many government agencies in Sweden were enjoying at the time in relation to the government departments. Despite the creation of an access gate to all government e-services for citizens – the "Sverige.se" portal, now closed down – this governance equation reached its limits; a lack of coordination was observed at all levels (e.g. organisational, financial and legal), leading among other drawbacks to the partitioned and duplicated development of the public e-services.

As a response to this, the e-government policy underwent a wide review which concluded with the publication in January 2008 of the "Action Plan for eGovernment" whose central goals were to rationalise policy governance; make the Swedish administration the "world's simplest Administration"; and take public services delivery to a higher level than that of mere provider–customer interaction. This would happen by rendering the recipient of a public service an actor of its delivery. This streamlining effort was continued with the establishment of an institution which became the centre protagonist of the system: the eGovernment Delegation (E-Delegationen in Swedish).

Since then, Sweden has been on the track of what it calls the "Third-generation eGovernment"; a concept brought to life by the "Strategy for the government agencies work on eGovernment" document prepared by the eGovernment Delegation.

==== Core aspects of the third-generation e-government ====
The core aspects of the third-generation e-government include:

- A simplified infrastructure for the electronic authentication of anyone willing to make use of e-government services requiring such authentication.
- Different government agencies to jointly develop shared public e-services.
- The re-use of infrastructure solutions.
- Common technical support for the development and implementation of the aforementioned shared services.
- Transparent funding mechanisms and updated legislation and regulation.
- A positive approach to the use of open standards and open source software in the public administration.
- The possibility for citizens and businesses to have a say, through electronic media, in decision making in the field of eGovernment.

==== Major developments ====
According to the United Nations' 2008 E-Government Survey, Sweden is internationally acknowledged as one of the most successful eGovernment countries and the world leader in terms of e-Government Readiness. As for the 8th EU Benchmark, it places the country among the top five European Union members states.

Instead of keeping a single electronic citizen entry point to the public administration, the government made the choice of web portals entirely dedicated to a given theme (e.g. taxation portal, health portal, employment, social insurance, etc.). On the contrary, businesses benefit from a one stop shop for entrepreneurs named "verksamt.se". This portal gathers company "life-event" procedures thus re-organising the public services provided by three government agencies in a user-friendly way.

Other e-government initiatives include:

- Electronic Invoices – All government agencies have been handling invoices electronically since July 2008.
- An electronic authentication infrastructure – referred to as E-Legitimation – enables the citizens' and businesses' access to secured public e-services.
- A set of public electronic procurement portals.

==== Actors ====
The Ministry for Local Government and Financial Markets holds the leadership over the Swedish e-government policy. Among other tasks, the eGovernment Delegation co-ordinates the work of the government agencies and departments by defining working lines, monitoring their application, and reporting to the Ministry for Local Government and Financial Markets. Furthermore, the eGovernment Delegation acts as an intermediary between the central government and the local governments – which steer their own eGovernment initiatives – to ensure good collaboration for the benefit of the country's entire public administration.

==== Key problems ====
The first problem is that within Sweden's municipality department units there are different isolated systems that are in use, from which each department is only familiar with their system and thus does not want to change, which creates a need for integration towards several case management systems within a single municipality, making it very expensive and time-consuming to adapt this solution. In addition to that, there has been a problem with regards to unstructured information that is being sent into the municipal online systems, since more citizens (especially the younger ones) have started to participate in the less controlled online environment. This is creating a flow of false information, which municipality workers are not yet ready to handle. There has been a tree of capitalising e-governance, called new public management, where citizens are often being viewed as consumers of public e-services in the market, which is reducing their sets of values when it comes to rights and duties.

== Other European countries ==
=== Iceland ===
Iceland is one of the pioneer countries in Europe in the use of digital solutions for the provision of governmental services to its citizens, with 63.3% of individuals and 89.0% of enterprises using the Internet for interacting with public authorities.

The government's efforts to enhance the use of eservices include Prime Minister's initiative to set up in June 2009 a tool kit to facilitate online public services for Icelanders.

Iceland's e-government policy is shaped through a series of strategic documents:

- In October 1996, the Government of Iceland publishes The Icelandic Government's Vision of the Information Society, describing the government's role in guiding information technology.
- In December 2007 an assessment report entitled Threats and Merits of Government Websites was published to demonstrate a detailed survey on the performance of online public services providing authorities with information on their status.
- Published in May 2008, Iceland's eGovernment Policy on Information Society for the period 2008 to 2012 is based on the "Iceland the e-Nation" motto and is built on three main pillars: service, efficiency, and progress. Its primary objective is to offer Icelanders online "self-service of high quality at a single location".

The Public Administration Act (No. 37/1993) as amended in 2003 sets the main eGovernment framework in Iceland. This Act has proven to be an important tool for state and municipal administration on individuals' rights and obligations.

Key actors responsible for the implementation of e-government include:

- Prime Minister's Office: in charge of information society and eGovernment policy.
- Information Society Taskforce: to co-ordinate the policy strategy.
- Icelandic Data Protection Authority (DPA): in charge of supervising the implementation of the Act on the Protection of Privacy as regards the Processing of Personal Data.
- Association of Local Authorities: to provide information on particular aspects of local authorities and municipalities (last visited: 13 October 2010).

=== Liechtenstein ===
==== National Administration Portal of Liechtenstein (LLV eGovernment Portal) ====
The national Administration Portal of Liechtenstein is the central instrument in the eGovernment process of the country. It started its operation in 2002 and provides e-services for citizens and enterprises. The portal comprises three main sections:

- Life topics, where information is presented structured around life events, such as marriage, passport, stay, etc.
- Public Authorities that contains detailed information on role and responsibilities of individual public authorities.
- On-line counter that contains downloadable forms to be completed and manually submitted to the relevant public authorities. Some of the forms can also be submitted electronically.

The LLV portal also offers a broad range of online applications. The most popular applications in November 2007 were:

- Business names index for enterprises
- Geospatial Data Infrastructure (GDI)
- Tax declaration
- Online calculator for price increase estimation
- Report and application service

==== Legislation ====
In Liechtenstein, e-government is supported by a variety of laws:

- The Information Act (Informationsgesetz) regulates the access to public documents.
- The Data Protection Act protects personal data.
- The Law on E-Commerce (E-Commerce-Gesetz; ECG, register no. 215.211.7) implements the European Directive 2000/31/EC on certain legal aspects of Information Society services, in particular electronic commerce, in the Internal Market (Directive on electronic commerce).
- The Law of Telecommunications and the Law on Electronic Communication (Kommunikationsgesetz; KomG, registry number 784.10) create the framework in the area of eCommunications legislation. The Office of Communication (Amt für Kommunikation) was instituted on 1 January 1999 constituting the regulatory authority for telecommunications services. (Note: Despite the adoption of the Law on Electronic Communication, Liechtenstein has not yet fully implemented and applied the 2002 EU regulatory framework on electronic communications. Furthermore, certain key provisions benefiting users, for example number portability when switching mobile operators, are still not effective (Ref: EFTA Surveillance Authority Annual Report 2006).)
- The Law on Electronic Signatures (Signaturgesetz; SigG, registry number 784.11) implements the European Directive 1999/93/EC on a Community framework for Electronic Signatures.

Liechtenstein has not implemented the Directive 2003/98/EC on the re-use of public sector information. The country is committed to the implementation of the public European public procurement directives 2004/17/EC and 2004/18/EC.

==== Actors ====
Policy and strategy are drawn by the Prime Minister and the Ministry of General Government Affairs. The Office of Human and Administrative Resources called "Querschnittsamt" is responsible for coordination, implementation and support of all eGovernment activities inclusive the National Administration Portal of Liechtenstein (LLV eGovernment Portal). The National Audit Office provides independent auditing services and the Data Protection Unit is responsible for the implementation of the Data Protection Act. Due to the small size of the country, all administration and realisation of eGovernment is provided centrally.

=== North Macedonia ===
The eGovernment in Macedonia started in 1999 with the establishment of the [Metamorphosis Foundation]. The Foundation worked towards the development of democracy by promoting the knowledge-based economy and the information society. In 2001 it implemented a project financed by Foundation Open Society Institute Macedonia and UNDP that established websites for 15 municipalities using a custom-made CMS.

In 2005 the National Strategy and Action Plan for Information Society Development was created for the implementation of eGovernment at a national level. In 2006 the first electronic passports and ID cards were issued to citizens of Macedonia. At the same year the eGov project, which aimed to improve the governmental services, was also launched. The latter together with the Public Procurement Bureau provided the necessary support towards the development of the national eProcurement system in 2008.

==== Architecture and design ====
A user-friendly interface is incorporated into the design of the website www.vlada.mk, making it accessible from a variety of devices including personal computers, tablets, and smartphones. It is broken down into a number of parts, such as news, e-services, legislation updates, and public consultations, amongst others, making it simple to navigate. Because the website adheres to the WCAG 2.0 requirements for web accessibility, it guarantees that its content may be accessed without difficulty by individuals who have mobility impairments.

==== Notable accomplishments ====
The website has been effective in simplifying a number of administrative procedures, which in turn has made it simpler for individuals to communicate with their respective governments. During the COVID-19 pandemic, it functioned as a venue for the dissemination of vital information and health guidelines, which contributed significantly to the success of its mission.

==== Challenges ====
Despite its successes, www.vlada.mk had obstacles, such as cybersecurity risks and a digital gap among the population of the country. The government is continuing its efforts to solve these concerns by implementing stringent safety precautions and expanding digital literacy training programs.

==== Demographics of the userbase ====
A varied range of people visit www.vlada.mk, which is reflective of the population of the country as a whole. It has seen an increase in utilization, particularly among younger generations that prefer to communicate with the government online.

==== Future plans ====
In order to keep up with the worldwide trend toward the digitization of public services, the government has plans to continue adding new features and functionalities to the website www.vlada.mk. This involves the continued development of electronic services and connection with other government portals, with the goal of providing a unified digital experience to all of the country's residents.

==== Strategy ====
The main objectives related to eGovernment strategy were laid down in the Government Programme (2006–2010) as this was developed in the National Information Society Policy and the National Strategy and Action Plan for Information Society Development document.

The basic elements analysed in those two documents are the following:

- Infrastructure
- E-business
- E-government
- E-education
- E-health
- E-citizens
- Legislation
- Sustainability of the strategy

The eGov project was launched in 2005 and has been operational since 2007 in 11 municipalities. It aims basically to implement modern e-government solutions in Macedonia. Through the project, documents have been made accessible to citizens, who may request information regarding their local council member, participation in forums etc.

==== Legislation ====
Although there is no national e-government legislation, the main legal objectives aim to cover the protection of cybercrime, the protection of data privacy and intellectual property rights, electronic business and the electronic communication services market. Further legal entities that have also been adopted are the following:

- Law on Personal Data Protection (adopted on 25 January 2005)
- Law on free access to information of Public character (entered into force on 25 January 2006)
- Law on Electronic Commerce (entered into force on 26 October 2007)
- Electronic Communications Law (entered into force on 15 February 2005)
- eSignatures Legislation
- Law on Public Procurement (entered into force on 1 January 2008)
- Law of Free Access to Information on Public Character

The Ministry of Finance, among others, promotes also the development of the legislative framework that supports digital signatures and other regulation related to e-commerce.

==== Actors ====
The responsibility for Macedonia's e-government lies with the Ministry of Information Society. More specifically, the Commission for Information Technology draws the national strategy and policy for IT. In charge of the measures coming from the National Strategy and Action Plan for Information Society Development is the Cabinet of the Minister.

=== Norway ===
Norway identified e-government as a policy subject as early as 1982. At that time, the first national IT policy paper entitled "Decentralisation and Efficiency of Electronic Administrative Processes in the Public Administration" was published. Since then, many public services have gone electronically and many developments have taken place in an attempt to strengthen the country's eGovernment policy.

Norway is one of the top-ranking countries worldwide in using electronic means to provide public services to citizens and businesses. In addition, MyPage, a self-service citizen portal offering more than 200 eServices to the public received the "Participation and transparency" European eGovernment Award in 2007 for offering innovative public services.

The e-government policy of Norway was first outlined in the "eNorway 2009 – The Digital Leap" plan document published in June 2005. This document focuses on:

- The individual in "Digital Norway";
- Innovation and growth in business and industry; and
- A co-ordinated and user-adapted public sector.

The "Strategy and actions for the use of electronic business processes and electronic procurement in the public sector" strategy document (October 2005) followed; and finally, the white paper "An Information Society for All" was created in 2006, focusing on the need for reform and efficiency improvements in the public administration, based on effective and standardised technical solutions.

The main actor in e-government in Norway is the Ministry of Government Administration, Reform, and Church Affairs. Its Department of ICT Policy and Public Sector Reform is responsible for the administration and modernisation of the public sector as well as national ICT policy. It also supervises the work of the Agency for Public Management and eGovernment (DIFI).

DIFI "aims to strengthen the government's work in renewing the Norwegian public sector and improve the organisation and efficiency of government administration". Additionally, the Norwegian Centre for Information Security is responsible for coordinating the country's ICT security activities.

=== Switzerland ===
==== State of play ====
The information society in Switzerland is highly developed bringing the country high at international benchmarks such as the UN eGovernment Readiness Index 2008 (12th place out of 189 countries) and the WEF Global Competitiveness Index 2009–2010 (second place out of 133 countries). In contrast to this, however, the status of the full online availability of public services in the country amounts to 32% according to the 8th EU Benchmark. This brings Switzerland on the 31st position among the EU27+ participating countries. Regarding the maturity of the services offered, the country achieves and an online sophistication index of 67%, placing itself on the 28th position in the same benchmark. These scores show that there is still a considerable potential to be utilised. This can be explained considering the effective operation of the traditional paper-based administration in Switzerland which resulted in less direct pressure for taking action in comparison to other countries.

==== Strategy ====
To unleash the potential offered by modern ICT, Switzerland has put in a place a strategic framework to drive e-government efforts at federal, cantonal, and communal level. The country's main strategic document is eGovernment strategy Switzerland, adopted by the Federal Council on 24 January 2007. This strategy is aimed at reducing administrative burdens through process optimisation, standardisation, and the development of common solutions. These goals are being realised by means of prioritised projects, following a decentralised but co-ordinated implementation approach throughout all levels of government. In parallel to these efforts, the ICT Strategy 2007–2011 has been adopted on 27 November 2006, to guide the implementation of the eGovernment efforts at a federal level. This document defines a framework setting out relevant strategic objectives and the responsible authorities. In addition, a set of partial strategies has been also put in place to complement the General ICT strategy, placing emphasis on more specific areas. These strategies are presented in the Federal Service-Oriented Architecture (SOA) 2008–2012 and the Open Source Software: Strategy of the Swiss federal administration document.

==== Actors ====
The overall strategic responsibility for ICT in the Swiss federal administration lies with the interministerial Federal IT Council (FITC) operating under the Ministry of Finance and chaired by the President of the Swiss Confederation. FITC is supported by the Federal Strategy Unit for IT (FSUIT) which acts as an administrative unit to the council. Moreover, the eGovernment Strategy of Switzerland is supervised by a steering committee, also under the Ministry of Finance, comprising three high-ranking representatives each from the confederation, the cantons, and the communes. The committee is supported by the eGovernment Switzerland Programme Office (within FSUIT) and an advisory board, composed of a maximum of nine experts from administration, the private sector, and academia. The Framework Agreement on eGovernment Cooperation, which covers the period 2007 to 2011, presents the above collaboration scheme shared by all levels of government (confederation, cantons, municipalities).

==== Infrastructure ====
The website ch.ch is Switzerland's main e-government portal offering access to all official services offered by federal government, cantons and local authorities. Content is available in German, French, Italian, Romansh, and English. In the 8th EU Benchmark the portal is placed in the first third of the EU27+ countries with respect to accessibility and has been assessed with a high score of 98% for its one stop shop approach and with a score of 83% regarding user focused portal design.

Another e-government infrastructure component is the simap.ch portal, Switzerland's mandatory e-procurement platform. The portal covers all major phases of public procurement ranging from issuance of invitations to tenders to the announcement of contract awards. Thereby, the entire process is implemented free of media discontinuities. Other websites are the www.sme.admin.ch, providing a broad spectrum of information for SMEs and the www.admin.ch website, the portal of the federal administration.

=== Turkey ===
Considerable progress has been made towards the modernisation of the Turkish public sector using eGovernment. E-government applications in Turkey have been basically focused on enterprises. Based on the seventh annual measurement of the progress of online public service delivery, Turkey ranked 20th.

==== Strategy and policy ====
The e-Transformation Turkey Project was launched in 2003, aiming to revise both the legal framework and policies around ICT in Turkey based on EU standards. Technical and legal infrastructure, e-health and e-commerce, policies and strategies are, according to the project, the main components of the process of Turkey's transformation into an information society. Two action plans were later developed to give a more detailed technical description of the project: the e-Transformation Turkey Project Short Term Action Plan 2003–2004 and the e-Transformation Turkey Project Short Term Action Plan 2005. According to the Information Society Strategy 2006–2010, which was initiated in 2005, Turkey's main strategic priorities are the following:

- a citizen-focused service transformation;
- social transformation;
- the ICT adoption by businesses;
- the modernisation in public administration;
- a competitive, widespread and affordable telecommunications infrastructure and services;
- a globally competitive IT sector; and
- the improvement of R&D and innovation.

Policy objectives have also been outlined at the Ninth Development Plan (2007–2013) which further analyses the targeting transformation of the country in the economic, social, and cultural sector.

==== Legislation ====
The main legal entities regarding the e-government in Turkey are listed below:

- eCommerce Legislation (entered into force in 2003)
- Right to Information Act (entered into force in 2004)
- eSignatures Legislation (entered into force in 2004)
- Law regarding the Protection of Personal Data (entered into force in 2008)
- eProcurement Legislation (amended in 2008)

==== Actors ====
The person in charge of e-government in Turkey is the Minister of State. The governmental body in charge of e-government policies is closely attached to the Prime Ministry. The Information Society Department of the State Planning Organisation has been responsible for the policy formulation since 2003.

=== Ukraine ===
The main coordinating government body in matters of e-government is Ministry of Digital Transformation created on 2 September 2019. It replaced State e-Government Agency established on 4 June 2014.

The beginning of the state policy of the development of the information society was the adoption in 1998–2006 of the Laws of Ukraine "On electronic documents and electronic document circulation", "On the national program of informatization", "On the electronic digital signature" and a number of state acts related to informatization. Later, the Law of Ukraine "On the Basic Principles of the Information Society in Ukraine for 2007–2015", "On Information Protection in Information and Telecommunication Systems" and some other legislative acts aimed at concretization and specification of these laws were adopted. This law emphasized the use of information and telecommunication technologies to improve public administration, relations between the state and citizens. The next stage of e-government development began in 2015 after the adoption of the Agreement of parliamentary factions of the Verkhovna Rada of Ukraine (in 2014) and the adoption of the Development Strategy "Ukraine – 2020", which was approved by Decree of the President of Ukraine dated 12 January 2015 (No. 5/2015).

In 2018, Ukraine ranks 82nd in the UN e-government ranking estimated to the one with high High EGDI (E-Government Development Index).

The Ukrainian government's new public e-procurement system—ProZorro—won a range of international rewards: the annual prize of the Open Government Awards 2016, the World Procurement Award (WPA) 2016 at Public Sector Awards etc.

Nonetheless, several other factors have contributed to Ukraine's rise in the global e-government rankings. Jordanka Tomkova, a Swiss funded E-governance Advisor in Ukraine and a Senior Governance Advisor at the INNOVABRIDGE Foundation, highlighted such factors: "First, several important legislative reforms such as the Law on Citizens' Petitions (2015), Law on Access to Public Information and Open Data (2015) and the Law on the Open Use of Public Funds were passed. Second, several notable online tools were launched by civil society. These have included the notably successful Prozorro electronic procurement platform which in its first 14 months of operation already contributed 1.5 billion hrivnas in state savings. The spending.gov.ua or the Price of the State platforms make tracking of state expenditures a more transparent and interactive process for citizens. E-petitions instruments were adopted by the Presidential Administration, by over 200 local government authorities and more recently by the Cabinet of Ministers. Smart City, open data, e-voting pilots and the growth of regional IT innovation centers such as the Impact Hub in Odesa, Space Hub in Dnipro and iHUB in Vinnytsia are important catalysts to local civic initiatives that focus on social innovation. Lastly, momentum is gaining ground, albeit slowly, in the introduction of e-services where several Ministries (including Justice, Economic Development and Trade, Social Policy, Ecology, Regional Development, Building and Housing, Infrastructure and the State Fiscal Service) have launched some of their first electronic services. These newly launched services are facilitating more rapid and cost-efficient business and construction licensing, monitoring of illegal waste dumps and the automation of a one-stop-shop style customs clearance service".

In 2019, the digitalization (e-governance) was made a priority of state policy in the newly formed Honcharuk government and the respective Ministry of Digital Transformation was thus created to shape and implement the strategy. In 2020, the Diia app and web portal were officially launched by the ministry which allowed Ukrainians to use various kinds of documents (including ID-cards and passports) via their smartphones as well as to access various government services. The government plans to transfer all governmental services to Diia by 2023.

=== United Kingdom ===
The Transformational Government – Enabled by Technology strategy, published in November 2005, sets out the vision to lead e-government developments in the United Kingdom. This document acknowledges technology to be an important instrument for addressing three major challenges of the modern economic, namely these of "economic productivity, social justice and the reform of public services" through transformation of the way the government works.

In particular, this strategy is aimed at improving transactional services and infrastructures of government to enable the transformation of public services to the benefit of both citizens and businesses. The vision is to use latest technologies that shall enable putting in place cost efficient services (to the benefit of taxpayers) and offer citizens more personalised services as well as the choice between new communication channels for their interactions with government. Last but not least, civil servants and front line staff will be actively supported by new technologies which will assist them in better accomplishing their tasks.

To realise the envisaged objectives UK's strategy focuses on the following fields of action:

- Citizen and Business Centred Services;
- Shared Services;
- Professionalism;
- Leadership and Governance.

Accordingly, public services should be designed around citizens and businesses following a shared services approach to take advantage of synergies; reduced waste; shared investments; and increased efficiencies that shall allow putting in place public services which will better meet the needs of citizens. Technological changes should be at the same time accompanied by the development of IT professionalism and related skills and should be complemented by solid leadership qualities and coherent governance structures.

UK's eGovernment strategy is complemented by the Putting the Frontline First: Smarter Government action plan of December 2009 containing concrete measures to improve public services for the period up to 2020. In parallel, the Digital Britain Final report forms the basis for an active policy to support the government in delivering high quality public services through digital procurement and digital delivery and assist the private sector delivering modern communication infrastructures. Latter report also envisages equipping citizens with the skills needed to participate and benefit from the information society. Additional efforts are also made in the field of open standards, in line with the Open Source, Open Standards and Re–Use: Government Action Plan of March 2009, based upon the fact that open source products are able to compete (and often beat) comparable commercial products featuring thus in many cases the best value for money to the taxpayer with respect to public services delivery. According to the Transformational Government Annual Report 2008, significant eGovernment progress has been already achieved or is well underway in the following areas:

- Tell Us Once service: This programme of strategic importance, currently in a pilot phase, aims to facilitate citizens to inform public authorities about a birth or death just once – the service will be responsible for the appropriate dispatch of this information to all relevant departments that may need it . Trials have already been put in place in the north and south east of the country, covering a population of 2 million people.
- Ongoing efforts for the rationalisation of the total number of public services websites: The integration of many former public websites into the two major public services portals of Directgov (citizens) and Businesslink.gov.uk (businesses) is underway resulting in an increased number of visitors for Directgov and increased user satisfaction for the Businesslink.gov.uk services.
- NHS Choices: This website offers online access to online health information and services. It was launched in 2007 and is visited by six million users per month.
- HealthSpace : This application can be accessed through the NHS choices website and both patients and doctors the possibility to store and update personal medical information online by using a secure account.
- Shared services: By the end of March 2008, the shared services of the Department for Work and Pensions (DWP) had delivered cumulative savings of £50 million (approx. €56 million at the beginning of 2010) or around 15% year on year.

E-government in the UK is regulated by a framework of laws covering a broad spectrum of relevant fields such as: Freedom of Information legislation (Freedom of Information Act 2000); data protection legislation (Data Protection Act 1998); legislation related to eCommerce (Electronic Communications Act 2000; Electronic Commerce (EC Directive) Regulations 2002); legislation concerning electronic signatures (Electronic Signatures Regulations 2002); and the re-use of public sector information regulations 2005.

==== Infrastructure ====
The public services portal Directgov is the major single access point for e-government services to citizens. Beyond the actual services offered, the portal also contains comprehensive information on a broad spectrum of fields, making navigation within further websites unnecessary. The equivalent of this portal for the business community is Businesslink.gov.uk providing access to business services. Participation to the services requires registration with the Government Gateway, a major authentication infrastructure component, allowing users to perform secure online transactions. Moreover, a third major website – NHS Choices – offers a broad spectrum of health related services and information. This website also serves as a front end to Health Space, an infrastructure component offering completely secure accounts where patients and their doctors can access, are able to store and update personal medical information.

In the field of networking, the Government Secure Intranet (GSI) puts in place a secure link between central government departments. It is an IP based Virtual Private Network based on broadband technology introduced in April 1998 and further upgraded in February 2004. Among other things it offers a variety of advanced services including file transfer and search facilities, directory services, email exchange facilities (both between network members and over the Internet) as well as voice and video services. An additional network is currently also under development: the Public Sector Network (PSN) will be the network to interconnect public authorities (including departments and agencies in England; devolved administrations and local governments) and facilitate in particular sharing of information and services among each other.

=== Serbia ===
Serbia has already completed several successful implementations over the years. In the years 2015 to 2018 they adopted the "Serbian Electronic Government Development Strategy" with which they showed their willingness to make further developments in the digital area. Since 2016, numerous laws have been implemented in connection to this subject. Some of those laws cover electronic documents, electronic identification and trust services in electronic commerce. Additionally, law about information security, which dealt with ICT system security, had also been implemented. In 2017, the Serbian Prime Minister put the digitalization of public administration as top priority.

==== E-Government Development Programme (2020–2022) ====
Between 2020 and 2022, Serbia conducted the E-Government Development Programme, an ambitious plan to enhance government services through digitization. The program's main goal was to use information and communication technology to make public services more effective, transparent, and accessible. It featured the creation of a comprehensive e-government site that would allow companies and people to access a variety of services online, simplifying administrative processes. Additionally, efforts were made to strengthen security protocols and educate government employees, assuring the safety of individual data and improving the development of the skills required for successful digital transformation. The program attempted to improve efficiency and convenience for both the government and the people by changing how public services are offered.

==== Key actors ====
E-uprava: The national e-government portal eUprava enables functionality and supports e-licensing activities such as filling out forms, receiving the data and attachments. The platform is customer-centric and provides easy information which is searchable. Published services have meta-data with standardized keywords. Each filled form is stored and treated separately, later on also archived. Automatic API exposes the collected data to integrate with other government systems and provides all the necessary methods to transfer the data and documents to another governmental agency for further processing.

E-ZUP: Information system for electronic transfer of data from all public administration organizations

E-inspector: Information system for business sector to have a clear insight into the work of inspections

Government Data Centre: A system for important communication infrastructure and information which saved Serbia millions of euros due to its quality and service standards.

== Specialized education ==
In recent years, some European academic institutions started offering masters courses in e-government. They are:

- Tallinn University of Technology, Estonia
- Koblenz-Landau University, Germany
- University of Trento, Italy
- Örebro University, Sweden
- École Polytechnique Fédérale de Lausanne, Switzerland
- University of Manchester, UK

== See also ==
- List of European Union directives
- European Interoperability Framework
- MinID
- Data embassy
