= Joinup =

Type of collaboration platform

Joinup platform
- Original authors: European Commission’s ISA² - Interoperability solutions for public administrations, businesses and citizens
- Stable release: v1.65.4 / 26 November 2020; 5 years ago
- Repository: github.com/ec-europa/joinup-dev
- Written in: PHP
- Engine: Drupal
- Available in: 1 languages
- List of languages EN
- License: EUPL 1.2
- Website: joinup.ec.europa.eu

Joinup (name replaced in 2024 by "Interoperable Europe Portal") is a collaboration platform created by the European Commission. It is funded by the European Union via its Interoperability Solutions for Public Administrations Programme (ISA Programme).

Joinup was launched on 9 December 2011. It replaced the Open Source Observatory and Repository (OSOR.eu) and the Semantic Interoperability Centre Europe (SEMIC.eu), themselves communities funded by the ISA Programme. These two became Joinup's initial communities.

Article 8 of the EU Regulation Interoperable Europe Act of March 13, 2024 created the Interoperable Europe Portal, which is the new name for Joinup

== Objectives ==
The site aims to let public administrations promote their e-government systems. More specifically, it offers a meeting place and a collaborative working environment for the development of interoperability. Joinup hosts communities of practice, such as the community for the Common Assessment Method for Standards and Specifications (CAMSS) and the community for the National Interoperability Frameworks Observatory (NIFO). The platform also raises awareness on free and open source software and semantic interoperability in the public sector. Joinup offers a catalogue of open source software, interoperability assets and models such as the Interoperability Maturity Model (IMM). The target audience includes those using, developing and implementing e-government systems. The site focuses on the European public sector, but the projects are open to all others.

== Platform, repository and federation ==
The platform has three main functions:

- Sharing of information, by publishing news, case studies and listing relevant events;
- Cataloguing re-usable interoperability software, taxonomies, vocabularies, code-lists, licences, organisational assets and guidelines;
- Allowing public administrations to collaborate with each other on development projects.

Joinup provides access to a Federation catalogue hosted by public administrations in EU member states and standardisation bodies such as the European Committee for Standardization (CEN) and European Telecommunications Standards Institute (ETSI).

Joinup is also used by the European Commission's Directorate General for Informatics to make available all of its applications. Examples include Circabc, a document management system, Open e-Prior, a tool to help manage electronic procurement, and OnLine Collection Software for ECI, to help organisations gather signatures that support their request to the European Commission to propose legislation.

In December 2014, the ISA Programme added the ePractice community to the Joinup platform. ePractice offers services for the professional community of eGovernment, eInclusion and eHealth practitioners. In January 2015, the OpenGovernment community was added by the EC's Directorate General for Communications Networks, Content and Technology

A detailed list of all the potential services someone receives by registering at this platform can be found at JoinUp's website.

A list of all the software contributions made by the community are at JoinUp's website.

As said in introduction the new name of the website is now (after April 2024) "Interoperable Europe Portal". The Portal hosts recent tools like the European Commissions' Licensing Assistant, which makes possible the open licenses selection and comparison based on more than 40 subjects or categories, with access to their SPDX identifier and full text.

== Open source technology behind Joinup ==
The Joinup platform is powered by a tailored version of the Drupal content management framework (version 6) and can be downloaded from the Joinup web site. Its latest version is 1.7.2 (released on March 15, 2015).

The source code of some past versions can be found at JoinUp's website.

The development of the platform is done on hosts running Debian Linux.

The Joinup platform runs on 10 hosts in the EC's datacentre in Luxembourg. It includes a load balancer, some network-attached storage and a reverse-proxy. The main part of the platform is on three Red Hat Linux hosts, running Apache webserver and Drupal. A fourth Linux host is running the Apache Tomcat Java server, the Apache Solr search engine and Apache Maven build automation tools. A fifth Linux host is running the Apache Subversion software versioning and revisioning system. There is a sixth Linux host running the MySQL relational database system and a seventh for GNU Mailman.

== Similar services ==
The platform's software is used to offer similar services involving public administrations in other regions and countries. In Australia and New Zealand, the Openray platform is being piloted since June 2012 by the Open Technology Foundation (OTF), a research organisation supporting the government sector in the research, evaluation, trialling and uptake of open technologies, standards and methods.

By 21 November 2013, all semantic services were federated and show up in the Openray repository.

Also on 21 November 2013, the government of South Australia announced that it would start piloting an internal version of the Joinup platform software and test the use of the EC's Open e-Prior. Its aim is to improve collaboration and procurement activities. Openroad is a similar collaboration platform, begun by Vietnam's Ministry of Science and Technology in January 2013.

== See also ==
Joinup is itself a federation of other, similar projects, such as the French Adullact. This was started in 2002 by the Association des développeurs et utilisateurs de logiciels libres pour les administrations et les collectivités territoriales, (Association of developers and users of free software for governments and local authorities). Adullact was actually an inspiration for the EC's Open Source Observatory and Repository.

Other examples would be the Spanish Centro de Transferencia de Tecnología (Centre for Technology Transfer), or La forja de Guadalinex, hosted by Junta de Andalucia.

The platform could also be compared with the National Information Exchange Model (NIEM), an XML-based information exchange framework from the United States. However, NIEM is designed to develop, disseminate, and support information exchange standards and processes that will enable jurisdictions to automate information sharing, the EC's Joinup is for sharing information technology.

Joinup might even be compared to the Comprehensive Knowledge Archive Network (CKAN). However, this focuses not on software packages or semantic assets, but on the storage and distribution of data, such as spreadsheets and the contents of databases.
