= Interoperable Europe Act =

European Union regulation on public sector interoperability

Regulation 2024/903
- European Union regulation
- Text with EEA relevance
- Title: Interoperable Europe Act
- Made by: European Parliament and Council of the European Union
- Made under: TFEU, Article 172
- Journal reference: OJ L, 2024/903, 22.3.2024

History
- Date made: 13 March 2024
- Entry into force: 11 April 2024
- Applies from: 12 July 2024

Preparative texts
- Commission proposal: COM(2022) 720

The Interoperable Europe Act (Regulation (EU) 2024/903) is a regulation of the European Union that establishes a framework for cross-border interoperability of network and information systems used to provide or manage public services in the EU. Adopted on 13 March 2024 and entering into force on 11 April 2024, the Act aims to facilitate seamless data flows and cooperation among public administrations across different administrative levels and sectors, thereby supporting the digital transformation of Europe's public sector and the creation of trans-European digital public services.

The legislation transitions the EU's approach to public sector interoperability from voluntary cooperation frameworks, such as the European Interoperability Framework (EIF), to a binding legal structure. It introduces mandatory interoperability assessments for new IT systems, establishes the Interoperable Europe Board for governance, and promotes the sharing and reuse of interoperability solutions, including free and open-source software (FOSS).

== Background and legislative history ==
The European Union has pursued public sector interoperability for over two decades, initially through funding programmes such as the Interchange of Data between Administrations (IDA) programme (1995–1999), the IDABC programme (2004–2009), and the ISA and ISA² programmes (2010–2020). These initiatives supported the development of the European Interoperability Framework (EIF), first issued in 2004 and updated in 2017, which provided non-binding guidelines for public administrations.

In March 2021, the European Commission published the "2030 Digital Compass" communication, which set targets for the digitalisation of public services, including the goal of 100% online accessible provision of key public services by 2030. This objective was later codified in the Digital Decade Policy Programme 2030 (Decision (EU) 2022/2481). To address the fragmentation and electronic barriers impeding the internal market, the Commission proposed the Interoperable Europe Act in November 2022.

The European Parliament approved the agreed text in plenary on 6 February 2024, with 524 votes in favour, 18 against, and 97 abstentions. The Council of the European Union adopted the act on 4 March 2024. The regulation was published in the Official Journal of the European Union on 22 March 2024 and entered into force on 11 April 2024, with most provisions applying from 12 July 2024, and specific requirements for interoperability assessments applying from 12 January 2025.

== Key provisions ==
=== Interoperability assessments ===
A central mechanism of the Act is the mandatory interoperability assessment (Article 3). Before a Union entity or public sector body takes a decision on new or substantially modified binding requirements for trans-European digital public services, it must conduct an assessment to evaluate the effects on cross-border interoperability. The assessment must identify relevant stakeholders and existing Interoperable Europe solutions that could support implementation. The outcomes of these assessments must be published in a machine-readable format on an official website and shared with the Interoperable Europe Board.

=== Sharing and reuse of solutions ===
Article 4 mandates that Union entities and public sector bodies make available interoperability solutions supporting trans-European digital public services to other requesting entities, including technical documentation and source code. The Act establishes a "share and reuse" default, aiming to reduce duplication of effort and costs. When deciding on implementation, public bodies are required to prioritise solutions that do not carry restrictive licensing terms, such as open-source solutions, where they are equivalent in functionalities, total cost, and cybersecurity.

=== Governance structure ===
The Act establishes a multi-level governance framework steered by the Interoperable Europe Board (Article 15). The Board is composed of one representative from each Member State and the Commission, with observers from the Committee of the Regions, ENISA, and the European Cybersecurity Competence Centre. The Board's tasks include adopting guidelines for interoperability assessments, developing and updating the European Interoperability Framework, recommending "Interoperable Europe solutions," and adopting the annual Interoperable Europe Agenda.

The Act also formally establishes the Interoperable Europe Community (Article 16), allowing public and private stakeholders, civil society organisations, and academic contributors to register and provide expertise to the Board.

=== Interoperable Europe Portal ===
The Commission is tasked with providing the Interoperable Europe Portal (Article 8) as a single point of entry for information related to cross-border interoperability. The portal provides access to recommended Interoperable Europe solutions, other shared solutions, and knowledge exchange mechanisms. In November 2024, the Commission's existing Joinup platform was transformed into the Interoperable Europe Portal.

=== Innovation and support measures ===
To foster innovation, the Act introduces provisions for interoperability regulatory sandboxes (Articles 11 and 12). These controlled environments allow public sector bodies to develop, train, test, and validate innovative interoperability solutions, including those involving personal data processing under specific safeguards, before integrating them into public networks. The Act also provides for policy implementation support projects, training programmes, and voluntary peer reviews among Member States.

== Reception and impact ==
The Interoperable Europe Act has been analysed as a significant step towards European "digital sovereignty" and digital autonomy, particularly by reducing dependency on non-European proprietary technology providers. Academic analysis suggests that the Act's promotion of Free and Open Source Software (FOSS) offers educational institutions and public administrations the ability to inspect, adapt, and control their digital infrastructure independently.

However, civil society organisations, such as the Free Software Foundation Europe (FSFE), have criticised aspects of the final text. The FSFE argued that the legislation was "watered-down" during trilogue negotiations, pointing to ambiguous wording regarding the prioritisation of open-source solutions. Specifically, the inclusion of criteria allowing public administrations to opt out of FOSS if proprietary solutions are deemed "equivalent in functionalities, total cost, user-centricity, cybersecurity or other relevant objective criteria" was viewed as a loophole that undermines a strict "Free Software first" approach.

Legal scholars have noted that the Act has a collaborative governance structure, integrating public bodies, private stakeholders, and self-regulatory mechanisms to establish interoperability standards, with an approach that extends beyond technical dimensions to include legal, organisational, and semantic interoperability.

== See also ==
- Digital Single Market
- European Interoperability Framework
- Data Governance Act
- Data Act (European Union)
- Digital sovereignty
