= Semantic Interoperability Centre Europe =

The Semantic Interoperability Community Europe (SEMIC.EU) was an eGovernment service initiated by the European Commission and managed by the Interoperable Delivery of European eGovernment Services to public Administrations, Businesses and Citizens (IDABC) Unit. As one of the 'horizontal measures' of the IDABC, it was established as a permanent implementation of the principles stipulated in the 'European Interoperability Framework' (EIF). It offered a service for the exchange of semantic interoperability solutions, with a focus on demands of eGovernment in Europe. Through the establishment of a single sharing and collaboration point, the European Union wanted to resolve the problems of semantic interoperability amongst the EU member states. The main idea behind the service was to make visible specifications that already exist, so as to increase their reuse. In this way, governmental agencies and developers benefit as they do not reinvent the wheel, they reduce development costs, and increase the interoperability of their systems.

In December 2011, the content and the activities of SEMIC.eu were migrated to a new collaborative platform: Joinup. The reason for the migration to Joinup was to provide public administrations in Europe with better communication and collaboration tools to share experience with interoperability solutions for public administrations, to increase the number of users and to leverage synergies between the OSOR.eu and SEMIC.eu user communities, while optimising the use of public funding.

== Objectives ==
The IDABC programme listed the efficient implementation of pan-European eGovernment services as an important purpose of SEMIC.eu. According to the website, the initial idea behind SEMIC.eu was “to make use of the knowledge already generated in other projects to the benefit of others”. As a network of eGovernment projects and communities, SEMIC.eu was open for participation to all stakeholders in the field of public services and eGovernment. The projects involved provided and re-used solutions for seamless data interchange, preserving the original meaning of the data. Data exchange methods were provided by stakeholders, harmonised and pooled. SEMIC.eu was also described as an implementation-oriented preparation for standardisation measures. Built upon its function as a facilitator of European harmonisation, the centre participated in international standardisation organisations. Another objective highlighted by the European Commission is the provision of scientific as well as practical information on all matters related to semantic interoperability.

== Platform, repository and service ==
The website www.semic.eu was built around a repository of real-life solutions labelled as 'interoperability assets' (XML schemas, code lists, ontologies, taxonomies, classification schemes, etc.) provided by projects and organisations in the sector. For instance, various French ministries and the Danish Telecom agency provided developed solutions.

The assets were subject to a standardised and supervised clearing process to ensure conformity with high quality standards. This involved peer review and incremental enhancement of the assets. However, they remained available at all stages of the process, making it possible to reuse them in different projects, contexts or domains at any time. Moreover, each asset contained a forum thread.

== See also ==
- European Interoperability Framework
- OSOR.eu The EU Open Source Observatory and Repository
