= Open Source Observatory and Repository =

EU online project for resources related to open source software

The Open Source Observatory and Repository (OSOR) is an online project launched by the European Commission under the IDABC programme, to support the distribution and re-use of software developed by or for public sector administrations across Europe, connecting EU services and Member States.

In December 2011, the OSOR.eu and SEMIC.eu communities moved to a new collaborative platform - Joinup. The reason for the migration to Joinup was to provide public administrations in Europe with better communication and collaboration tools, to share experiences with interoperability solutions for public administrations, to increase the number of users and to leverage synergies between the OSOR.eu and SEMIC.eu user communities, while optimising the use of public funding.

== About the platform ==
The OSOR.eu platform aims to support and encourage the re-use of publicly financed Open Source Software developments (OSS or FLOSS for "Free, Libre & Open Source Software") that are of particular use for public administrations in Europe. OSOR.eu aims to support the collaborative development of OSS applications and solutions, in particular cross-border collaboration and exchange of knowledge or software.

== Services ==
All of OSOR's services are now available on Joinup.eu:

- A central pan-European information point on OSS including news, events, case studies and newsletters about on-going initiatives, projects, new applications and developments in European Members States and across the world, as well as advice/guidelines and best practice exchanges concerning the use of OSS.
- A repository and registry providing visibility to European OSS projects and initiatives in public administrations, allowing users to upload and download, search and retrieve software and documentation. It facilitates mutual access to existing projects through a dedicated taxonomy and therefore creates more opportunities to develop exchanges, re-usability and community building across borders.
- A collaborative cross-border development environment providing technical, organisational and legal support. It enables collaborative development and sharing/exchange of experience and software by providing facilities for the collaborative creation of content - including a "forge", discussion forums, blogs.

== Bodies behind the project ==
The OSOR project is financed by the European Union, managed by the European Commission under the Directorate-General for Informatics (DIGIT), and supported by the Member States' national, regional and local administrations.
