= Carta nazionale dei servizi =

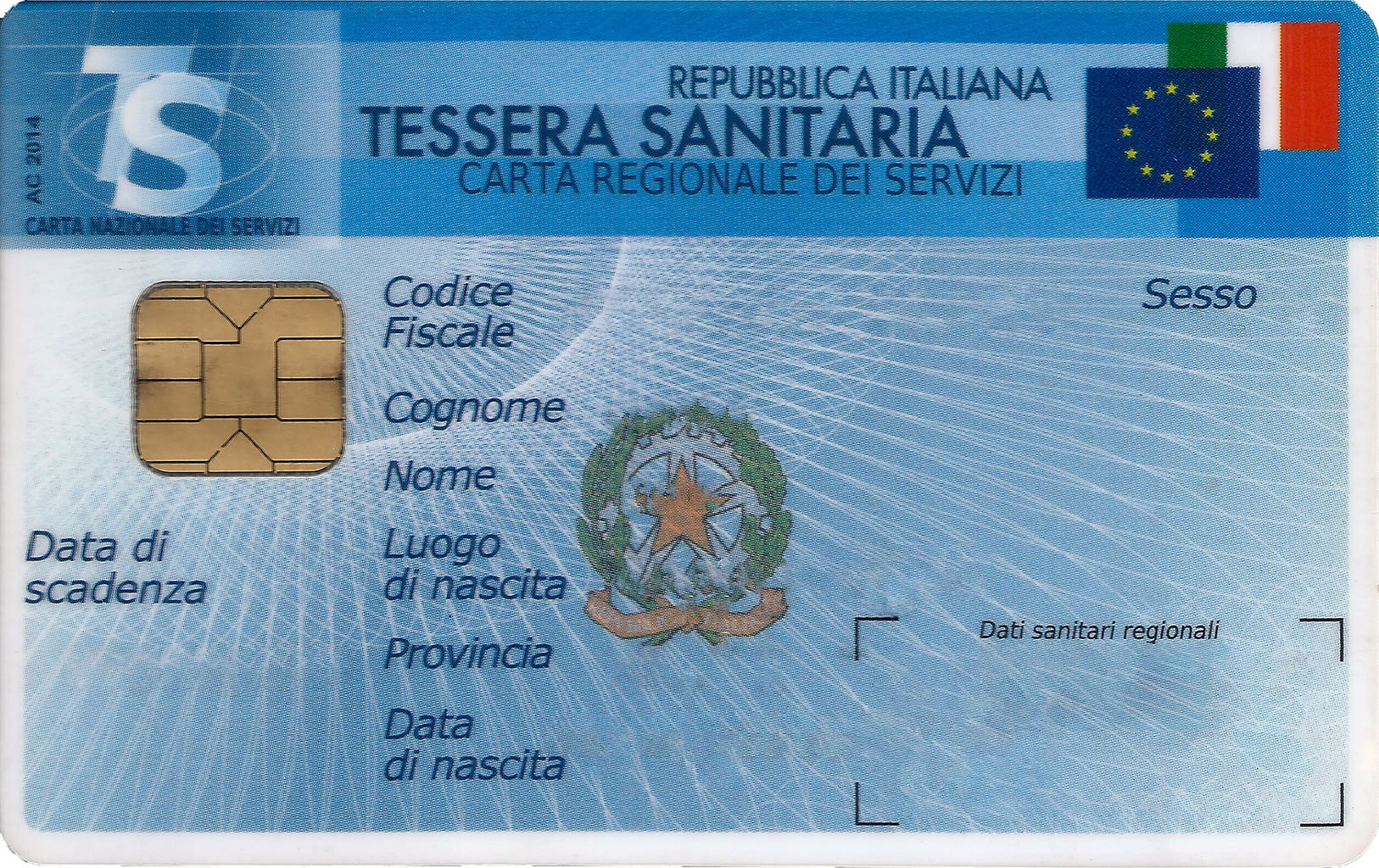
The front of National Services Card.

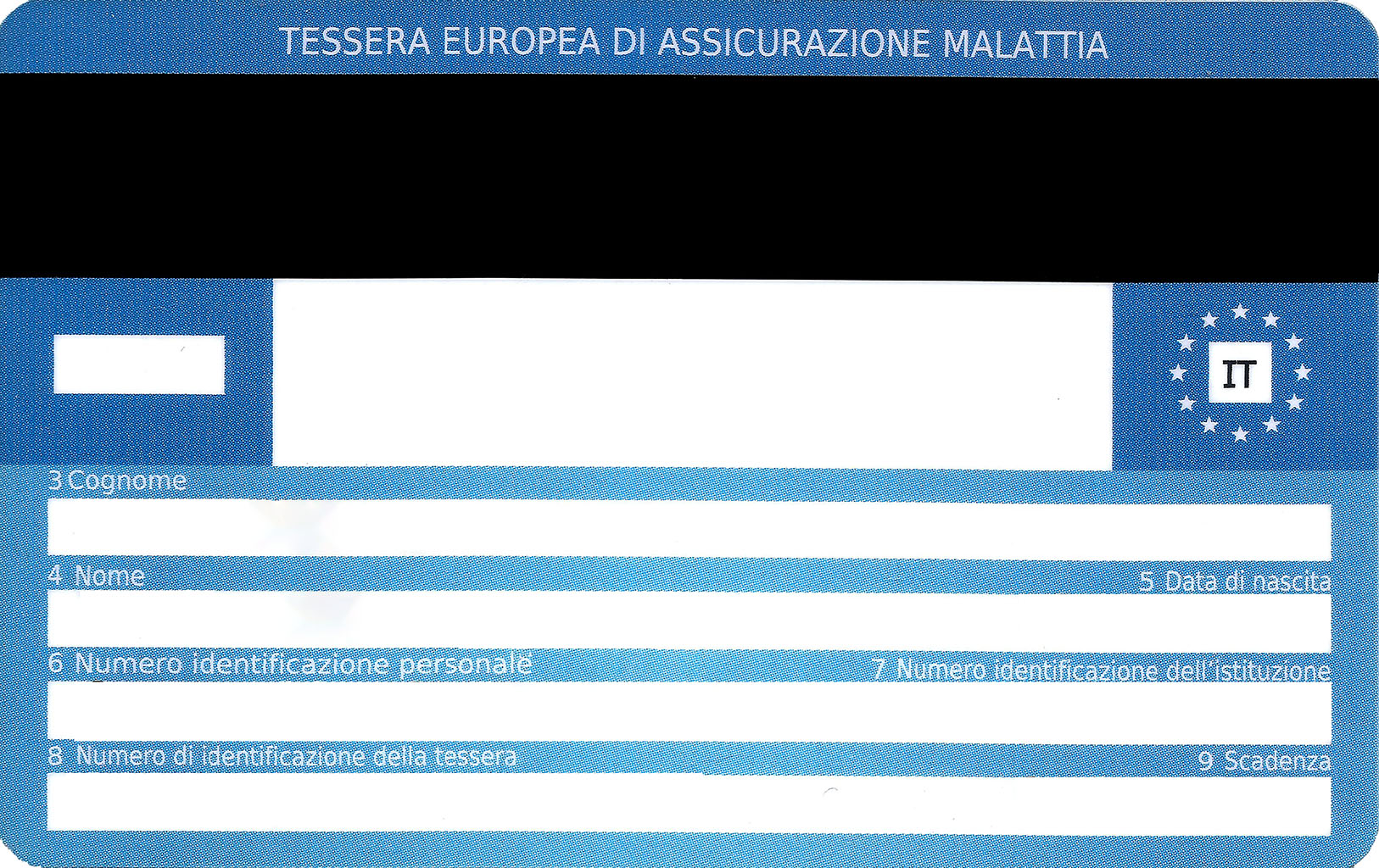
The back of National Services Card, which includes the European Health Insurance Card.

The Carta nazionale dei servizi (in English National Service Card) (CNS) is an Italian personal document which is placed alongside the Italian electronic identity card.

It has the aim of allowing users who do not yet have the new electronic document to use the services provided for the CIE and integrates the functions of the health card of the Italian National Health Service and of the European Health Insurance Card.

The complete IT correspondence between CNS and CIE ensures interoperability between the two cards and the possibility for citizens to access public administration online services with both cards.

The CNS can be defined as a standard of cards that can be issued by different entities (for example, the regional service card issued by the regions of Lombardy, Umbria, Sicily, Friuli-Venezia Giulia, Puglia and Tuscany and by the autonomous provinces of Bolzano and Trento are simultaneously national and European health cards and national services cards), but which nonetheless allow access to all national services.

With the DPR 2 March 2004, n. 117, the "Regulations concerning the diffusion of the national service charter are issued, in accordance with art. 27, paragraph 8, letter b), of law no. 3 of 16 January 2003".

The national service card is an ISO/IEC 7810 : 2003 ID-1 format smart card (85.60 mm × 53.98 mm × 0.76 mm) which follows the ISO/IEC 7816 standard and has an asymmetric encryption system necessary to guarantee authenticity of the card itself. The following data are stored inside:

- PIN code, necessary to access the smart card private key
- PUK code, code necessary to unlock the smart card in case of 3 attempts to access with the wrong PIN
- 1024 bit RSA private key, needed to digitally sign documents or guarantee access to online services
- 1024 bit RSA public key, necessary to check the authenticity of documents digitally signed with the same smart card (exportable)
- A digital certificate in X.509 standard
- Card ID, to uniquely identify the card in the national territory
- Personal data such as name, surname and tax code.

== Use ==
To use CNS you need:

- activate it at the authorized counters of each Italian region to receive the PIN of the same
- download compatible drivers (PKCS # 11 standard) found on individual regional sites
- have a smart card reader (compatible with PC/SC specifications). Some administrations such as the autonomous province of Bolzano or the autonomous province of Trento deliver one free of charge upon activation of the card.
