= IPM (software) =

The Interactive Policy Making, or IPM, is an online opinion poll management system launched in 2001, which is used to gather the opinion of European Union citizens and entreprises regarding policy development. The software is part of the Interactive Policy Making Initiative and is made of various modules which assist in the creation of such questionnaires - including a creation, translation, test, launch and analysis module.

== History ==
The European Commission started using the system at the end of 2001, and introduced it to the public through the "Your Voice in Europe" program.

In 2002, prior to the launch of the top-level domain .eu, the European Commission used IPM to gather the opinion of companies regarding cybersquatting.

In 2006, the European Commission released IPM OSS, an open source version of the software aimed at companies and private organizations.
