= European Interoperability Framework =

Recommendations for communication between entities in the European Union

The European Interoperability Framework (EIF) is a set of recommendations which specify how administrations, businesses and citizens communicate with each other within the European Union and across Member State borders.

The EIF 1.0 was issued under the Interoperable Delivery of European eGovernment Services to public Administrations, Businesses and Citizens programme (IDABC). The EIF continues under the new ISA programme, which replaced the IDABC programme on 31 December 2009.

EIF in effect is an Enterprise architecture framework targeted at the largest possible scale, designed to promote integration spanning multiple sovereign Nation States, specifically EU Member States.

For further examples of Enterprise Architecture frameworks designed operate at different levels of scale, see also Alternative Enterprise Architecture Frameworks

The EU's approach to public sector interoperability is moving from these voluntary cooperation frameworks, to a binding legal structure, underpinned by the Interoperable Europe Act. This Act introduces mandatory interoperability assessments for new IT systems, establishes the Interoperable Europe Board for governance, and promotes the sharing and reuse of interoperability solutions, including free and open-source software (FOSS).

This turn towards a legally binding approach is also visible in the development of sectoral interoperability frameworks by the European Commission. These frameworks have in particular been developed since 2020 within the context of the European strategy for data and the creation of Common European Data Spaces. These initiatives complement the general principles of the European Interoperability Framework by introducing domain-specific requirements, particularly regarding data formats, technical standards, governance arrangements, and cross-border data exchange. Their level of maturity varies significantly across sectors.

In some cases, such as health, these developments have led to the adoption of binding legislation. The European Health Data Space (EHDS) regulation establishes common requirements for the structuring, format, and exchange of certain categories of electronic health data (Article 15). It also provides for the development of infrastructure enabling the cross-border exchange of health data between Member States, in particular through the MyHealth@EU network.

== Versions ==
=== EIF Version 1.0 ===
EIF Version 1.0 was published in November 2004.

Further non-technology obstacles that stand in the way of greater EIF adoption include the facts that EU Member States currently differ widely in terms of:

- Scope of government - services provided, degree of state ownership of businesses, scale of armed forces, police and border control operations
- Structure of government - central/local government balance, what departments exist, how departments interact
- Citizen/state interaction models - processes related to key life events (births, marriages, deaths), document issue procedures, support for foreign languages

=== EIF Version 2 ===
Draft Version 2 of the EIF was the subject of a political debate, where the main technology/commercial issues relate to the role of lobbying for proprietary software.

EIF 2 was adopted by the European Commission as the Annex II - EIF (European Interoperability Framework) of the Communication “Towards interoperability for European public services” on 16 December 2010.

=== 'New EIF' ===
On 23 March 2017, the ISA2 programme released a new version of EIF. This version dropped version numbers and is simply called 'new EIF' and should include policy changes of the past years.

== See also ==
- Semantic Interoperability Centre Europe
