= E-Estonia Briefing Centre =

Organization based in Tallinn

e-Estonia Briefing Centre
- Company type: Government institution
- Industry: Information and communication technologies
- Founded: January 2009
- Headquarters: Tallinn, Estonia
- Website: http://www.e-estonia.com/

e-Estonia Briefing Centre is a centre established in 2009 by MicroLink Eesti AS, Santa Monica Networks AS, Datel AS, Elion Ettevõtted AS, EMT AS and Ülemiste City AS as The Estonian ICT Demo Centre. From 2014-2019 it was known as the e-Estonia Showroom, becoming the e-Estonia Briefing Centre in February 2019. The centre tells the story of e-Estonia, called the most advanced digital society by Wired magazine. Presentations are given to visiting delegations interested in digitalisation and the centre aims to educate policy makers, political leaders, and bring together Estonian companies with visitors from all over the world.

The Briefing Centre has become an important destination in Tallinn, hosting over 10,000 international decision-makers every year from 135 countries including presidents and ministers to CEOs and journalists. Most notable visitors include King Philippe of Belgium, King Willem-Alexander of the Netherlands, Chancellor of Germany Angela Merkel and more.

== Background ==
The Demo Centre was opened on January 29, 2009 in the Ustus Agur House in Ülemiste City and it became a subdivision of Enterprise Estonia in 2014. In February 2019, the centre was relocated to Valukoja 8, where it became the e-Estonia Briefing Centre.

== Current activities ==
e-Estonia Briefing Centre is located in the Öpik Building, Ülemiste City business district in Tallinn, where it hosts international decision-makers from the public and private sector and coordinates G2G, B2G and B2B relations. Visitors have the chance to learn about what it takes to build a digital society, from electronic ID to data privacy, cyber security and much more. The centre also provides customised programmes for delegations with deeper and more specific interests.

In addition, the Briefing Centre has a central role in the development of the e-Estonia brand and country promotion. This includes coordinating online communication and representation in international conferences.
