= Estonian Information Technology College =

Vocational university in Tallinn

Coordinates: 59°23′44″N 24°39′52″E

- Eesti Infotehnoloogia Kolledž
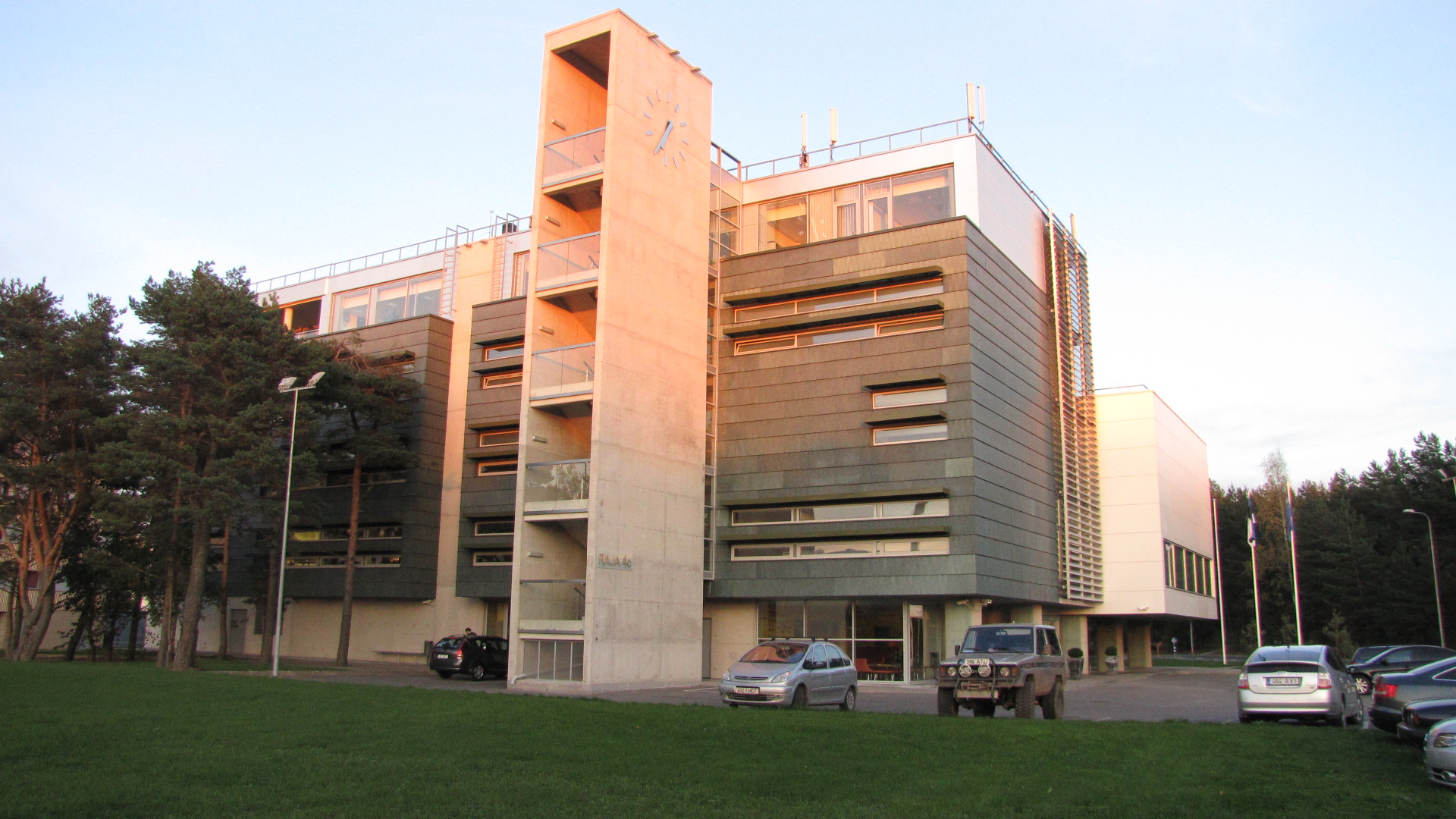
- Type: Private, non-profit
- Established: 2000
- Rector: Tiit Roosmaa
- Faculty: 11 full-time, ~40 part-time (2012; varies by year/term)
- Administrative staff: 21 (2012)
- Students: ~900 (2012)
- Location: Tallinn, Harju County, Estonia
- Mascot: Tux (informally)
- Website: www.itcollege.ee
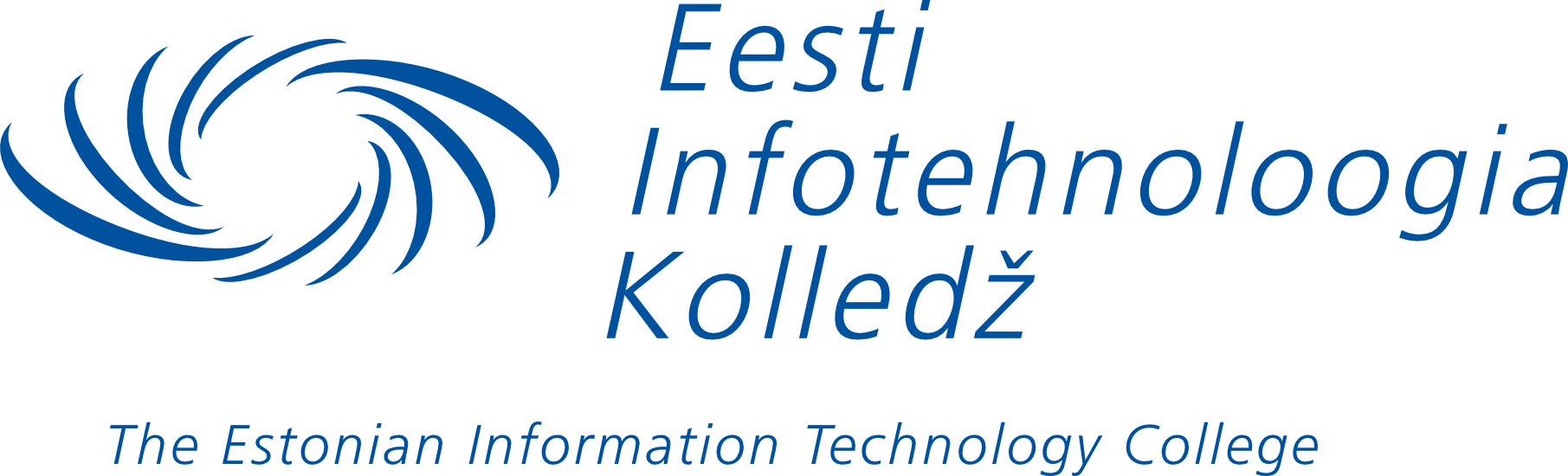

The Estonian Information Technology College (EITC) (Estonian: Eesti Infotehnoloogia Kolledž (EIK)) was a private non-profit institution of professional higher education (university of applied sciences) in Estonia, located in Tallinn. EITC provided Estonian applied higher education diploma-level (at least 180 ECTS credit points; equal to the Bachelor's degree under the Bologna process) education in information technology in four main programmes (IT Systems Administration, IT Systems Development, Information Systems Analysis and Technical Communication), carried out shorter-term vocational training programmes as well as various R&D-oriented activities. In 2017 it merged with the Tallinn University of Technology.

== Founding and History ==
The governing body of the IT College, the Estonian Information Technology Foundation, was established in March 2000 by the Republic of Estonia (represented by the Ministry of Education and Research), the University of Tartu, the Tallinn University of Technology, AS Eesti Telekom, and the Estonian Association of Information Technology and Telecommunications. One of the main forces behind the formation of EITC was the rapidly growing need for IT professionals which could not be met by universities and attracted people with uneven educational and professional background. During the first years, all students had to pay for the tuition (a small number of stipends were available for best students) - however, starting from 2007, 100 places are funded by the state, in a similar manner to state universities. In addition, up to 150 self-financing students are admitted every year.

The college was inaugurated by the Prime Minister Mart Laar in September 2000 and received the Estonian Award of Educational Achievement for that year. The location was in the downtown Tallinn until 2008 when the college moved into a new building in Mustamäe, at the vicinity of Tallinn University of Technology and Tehnopol.

Kalle Tammemäe served as the rector of EITC from the beginning to 2010. Linnar Viik held the office in 2011, the current rector Tiit Roosmaa was inaugurated in August 2011.

== Academic studies ==
The college's three-year curriculum totalling at 180 credit points in the European Credit Transfer System produces a specific vocational qualification equal to a bachelor's degree. The college's priority is to train IT specialists, yet graduates may choose to pursue their studies at the master's level either in Estonia or abroad.

The IT Systems Development and IT Systems Administration programmes are available in the daytime study format either in full-time, part-time or external study forms. The Information Systems Analysis and Technical Communication programmes are available in the evening study format in full-time, part-time or external study forms. The evening study format with classes starting at 6 p.m. on business days is targeted at the people who work during the daytime. All four programmes have received full accreditation.

The graduates of the IT Systems Administration programme will have been taught of the structure, indicators and functions of appropriate IT systems (computer and telecommunications networks, Internet, databases etc.). They should be able to administer, expand and retune these systems, as well as contribute to developing new services and applications.

The IT Systems Development programme provides an education in the field of software development and IT systems (computer and telecommunications networks, Internet, databases etc.). Graduates will develop knowledge of different programming languages and tools, development environments and teamwork basics necessary for development of modern application software.

The graduates of the Information Systems Analysis programme will have the knowledge of the processes occurring in both IT and business systems. They will be able to participate in devising complex business information systems, applications or services and work as applications integrators, system architects, data systems developers and system analysts.

The Technical Communication programme introduces students not only to the basics of IT but also skills in oral and written self-expression, and knowledge of design, printing technology, etc. Graduates in this subject area will be able to work in positions that require providing users of IT products and services with specific IT terminology and content. Graduates will have the skills of producing user guidelines, product catalogues and technical texts (both as publications and web-based presentations) for selected target groups, and designing advertising / promotional materials.

The language of instruction is Estonian, but some courses are available in English as well.

Completing a three-year programme of 180 credit points students acquire a special qualification that corresponds to the bachelor's degree and is aimed at working in a specific field. The graduates are able to continue their studies at the master's level at Tallinn University of Technology, Tartu University or elsewhere.

== Research and development ==
Although EITC is not a research-oriented institution, it takes part in a number of applied research and development projects. Via the EITF as the mother institution, it also cooperates with the Estonian e-Learning Development Centre in various national and international development projects and events in e-learning.

== Vocational training ==
EITC offers a wide variety of vocational training courses on a diverse choice of subjects (operating systems, application software, software development, systems administration, data security etc.) on different levels. The college is also a training partner to the Estonian Unemployment Insurance Fund, taking part in retraining programmes for unemployed people.

== Public lectures ==
The tradition of public lectures at EITC is as old as the college itself (the first one took place in 2000.) Over the years, the lecturers have included Richard M. Stallman from the Free Software Foundation, Jon 'Maddog' Hall from Linux International, Mikko Hyppönen and Jarno Niemelä from F-Secure, Akira Hirooka from DoCoMo, Andrew Kass from Microsoft, U.S. Ambassador to Estonia Michael C. Polt and many others.

== Student life and traditions ==
- The EITC Robotics Club aims towards practical application of academic knowledge by creative work, increasing the motivation to study and teamwork skills as well as promoting the college. The RC is a many times winner and runner-up of the annual nationwide Robotex robotics contest.
- MUG and LUG - there is a (usually friendly) rivalry between the Microsoft and Linux user camps.
- The New Beginning Initiative is a recurring project to restore and restock old computers which are then donated to those in need (schools, orphanages etc.).
- The Curiosity Day is the annual visitor day for prospective students, where EITC students play an important part in bringing in fresh people.
- The Shrove Tuesday Bun. (Bun Point) is the annual celebration of Shrove Tuesday with free buns and soft drinks.
- The Student Bar turns the cafeteria into a pub for one evening in a term.
- The April Fools' Day has seen MIT-style hacks (e.g. rewriting the cafeteria whiteboard to display IT-related names for dishes).
- Student Festivals are larger events for all students twice in a year. At EITC, these are celebrated with various events like rock concerts or sports competitions (also featuring events like printer throwing or CRT carrying).

== Accessibility ==
EITC has given high priority to accessibility and special needs since its foundation. The current building was erected with accessibility in mind and was tested by a disability activist group in 2010, and as a result, received 2.7 points out of 3 (at the time, it was considered the only Estonian UAS to be fully accessible). The college subsequently received a commendation from the Estonian Chamber of Disabled People.

== Scholarships ==
Throughout the history of the college (as of 2012), the scholarships have been founded by Baltic Computer Systems, Datel, Elion, EMT, Eesti Ühispank / SEB, Hansapank / Swedbank, Hewlett-Packard, IBM, Kungla Dialoog, Liewenthal Electronics, Mantador Estonia, Microlink, Microsoft, Nokia, Open Estonia Foundation, Oracle, Santa Monica Networks, Starman, Sybase Symantec, Tallinn City Government and Tele2.

== Partnership programmes ==
The college takes part in the following partnership programmes:

- Microsoft IT Academy and MSDN Academic Alliance (since 2003); a dedicated faculty position is funded by Microsoft since 2008.
- Oracle Academy (since 2002).
- Cisco Networking Academy (Cisco Regional Network Academy since 2002).
- Linux Professional Institute (LPI Academic Training Partner since 2011).

== International Cooperation ==
International partnerships include

- Lulea University of Technology (Sweden)
- University of Aveiro, University of Madeira (Portugal)
- Yeditepe University, Istanbul Arel University (Turkey)
- University of Zilina (Slovakia)
- University of Rostock, Schmalkalden UAS, Kiel UAS (Germany)
- University of Economy Bydgoszcz (Poland)
- Haaga-Helia UAS, Laurea UAS, Vaasa UAS, Turku UAS (Finland)
- Copenhagen Technical College (Denmark)
- HU University of Applied Sciences Utrecht (Netherlands)
- Technological Educational Institute of Crete (Greece)
- University of Applied Sciences Technikum Wien (Austria)
- Vilnius College, Kaunas College (Lithuania)

== Miscellaneous ==
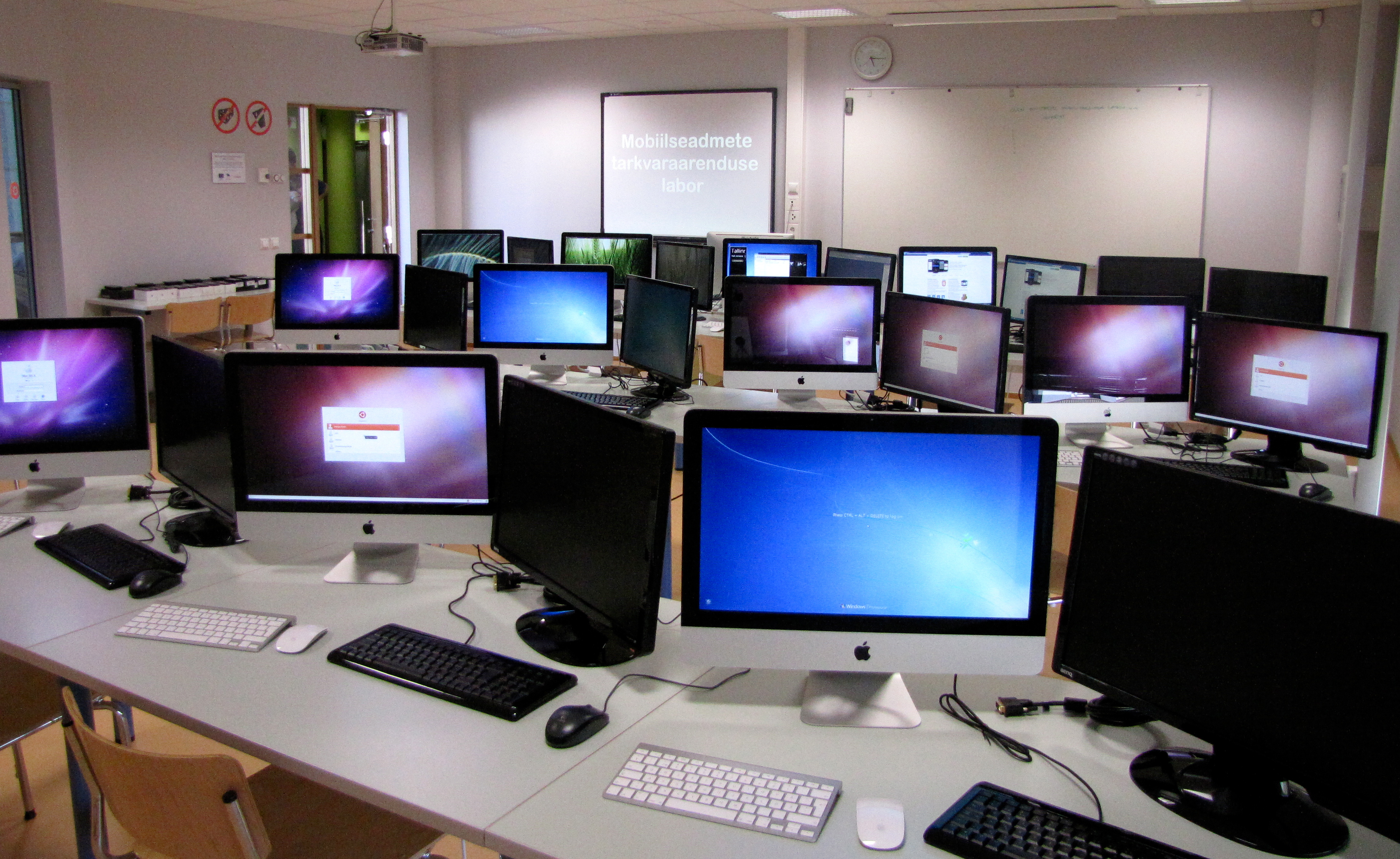
The software development lab for mobile platforms at EITC

- The college uses a small team of core faculty combined with a much larger number of visiting lecturers (either academics from different universities (TUT, UT, TLU) or experienced practitioners from the field) in order to strike a balance between academic excellence and practical experience.
- An important part of the techno-culture of EITC has been technological agnosticism and plurality of platforms. All the PC labs were designed to run dual-boot (MS Windows + a flavour of Linux) from the day one, the Apple lab was added in 2004 and a triple-boot mobile platforms (iOS, Android, Windows Phone, MeeGo) lab running on Apple hardware in 2011.
