= E-Governance Academy =

Organization based in Estonia

e-Governance Academy (eGA)
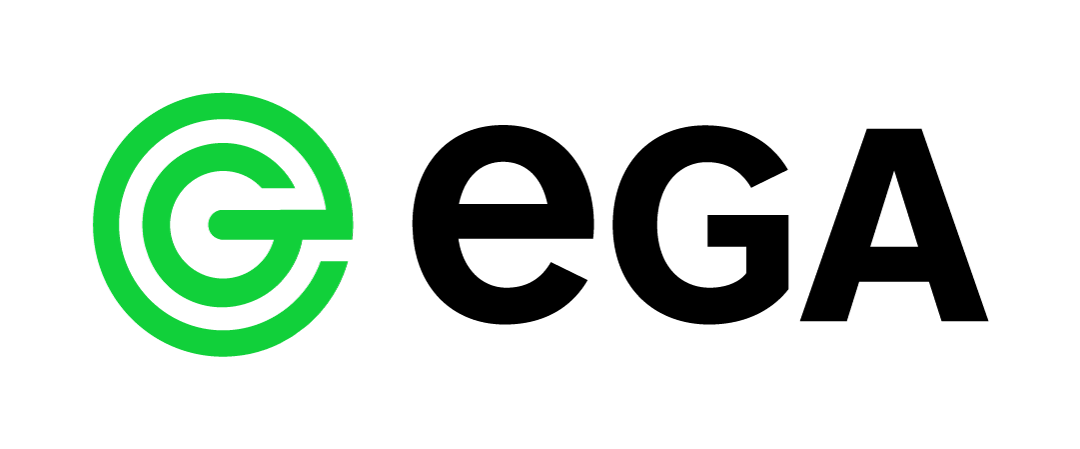

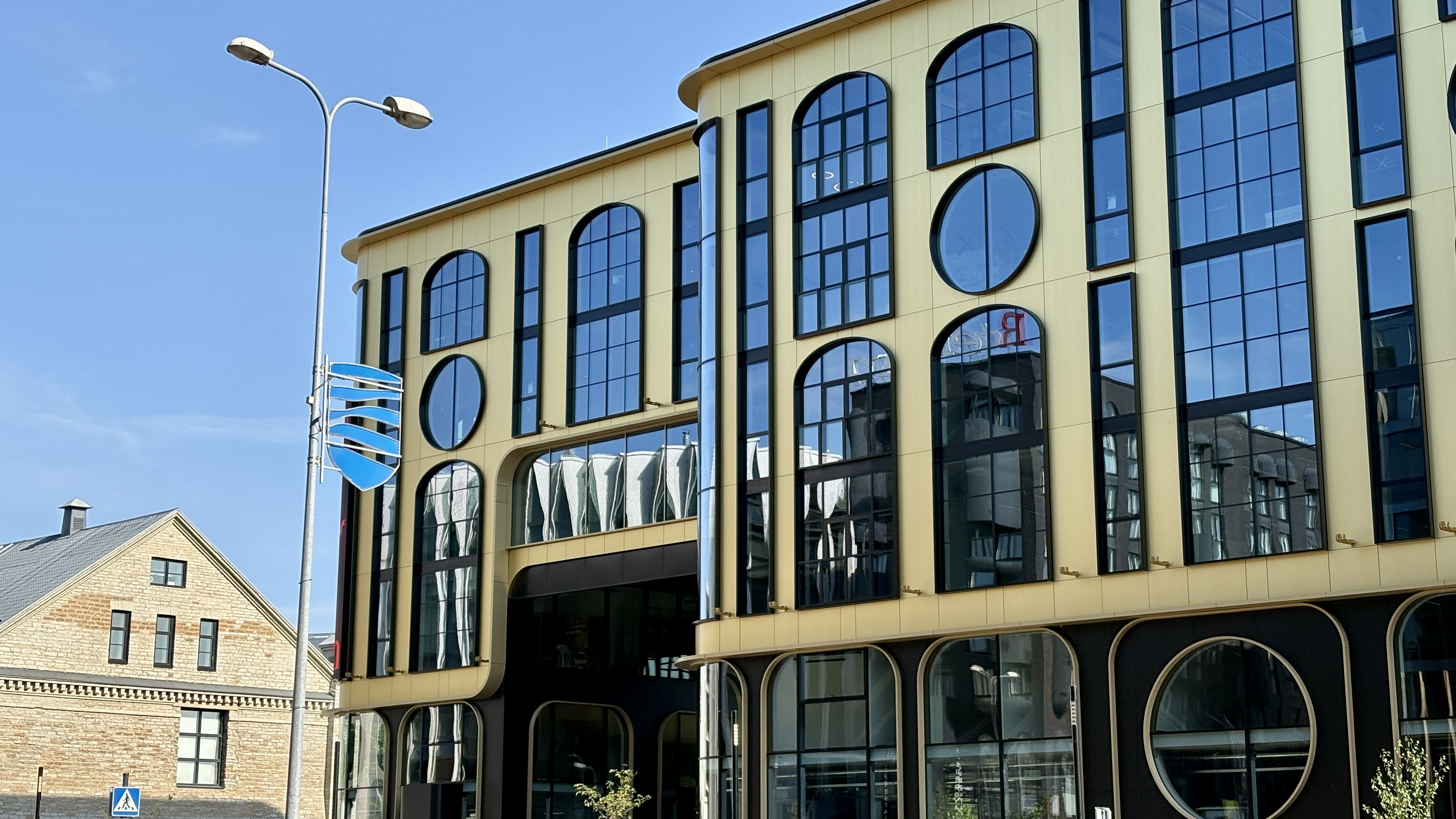
- eGA Headquarters
- Formation: 2002; 24 years ago
- Type: Non-profit organisation
- Headquarters: Ahtri 6, 10151, Tallinn, Estonia
- Chairman, Management Board: Hannes Astok
- Affiliations: European Commission, UN Development Programme
- Website: ega.ee

e-Governance Academy (eGA, Estonian: E-riigi Akadeemia Sihtasutus) is a non-governmental organization that assists public sector institutions in digital transformation reforms. The organisation collaborates with international and regional development aid funders, including the European Union, World Bank, and NATO.

eGA has provided assistance and consultations in more than 145 countries, including Ukraine, Bangladesh, Benin, Bosnia and Herzegovina, Mongolia, Moldova, Montenegro, Sierra Leone, Barbados, the Cayman Islands, Guyana, the Faroe Islands, and India.

As of 2026, the organisation maintained offices in Kyiv, Ukraine; Chișinău, Moldova; Belgrade, Serbia; and Dhaka, Bangladesh in addition to its headquarters in Tallinn, Estonia.

== History ==
eGA was founded in 2002 by a joint initiative of the Government of Estonia, Open Society Institute, and the United Nations Development Program (UNDP) to promote digital governance.

Since 2015, eGA has hosted an annual e-Governance Conference. In 2016, eGA first published the handbook "e-Estonia: e-Governance in Practice," which was later translated into languages including Japanese, Thai, and Spanish. Since 2024, eGA has organized the Tallinn Cyber Diplomacy Summer and Winter Schools, which bring together emerging cyber leaders from dozens of countries.

eGA is an EU pillar-assessed organization that is internationally certified by the International Organization for Standardization. It is also an advisory observer to the Secure Identity Alliance (SIA), member of the Estonian Roundtable for Development Cooperation and partner of the Global Forum on Cyber Expertise (GFCE).

== Notable projects ==
=== Digital Transformation in Ukraine ===
eGA has contributed to extensive digital transformation initiatives in Ukraine through European Union-funded programmes in collaboration with the Ministry of Digital Transformation (Ukraine) and other governmental organizations. These projects have established the main foundations of the Ukrainian digital state and supported the development of over 150 digital public services. Examples of these initiatives include:

- Diia - a government mobile application and web portal providing access to public services for citizens and businesses.
- Trembita - a national secure data-exchange platform that enables interoperability between government information systems and state registers.
- Diia.Engine - a government registry platform across multiple sectors, including agriculture and healthcare.
- Vulyk - an information system which automates administrative application processing.
- Diia.Signature - a digital signature system used for legally recognised identity authentication and electronic transactions. The related e-Apostille program is used for the identification of digital Ukrainian documents abroad.
- Smereka - a case management system for law enforcement. Hosted by the Office of the Prosecutor General of Ukraine, this capacity is also used to document and manage war crime investigations since Russia’s full-scale invasion of Ukraine in 2022.

As part of the EU Digital Transformation for Ukraine (DT4UA) Project, eGA has supported the harmonization of Ukraine's digital environment with the EU Digital Single Market and the Interoperable Europe Act.

=== Public Digital Infrastructure ===
Drawing from the X-Road model developed in Estonia, eGA has supported the development of secure data exchange platforms for interoperability and digital government services in several countries. Notable examples include Trembita in Ukraine (with the Ministry of Digital Transformation of Ukraine and Cybernetica AS), NamX in Namibia (with the Ministry of Information and Communication Technology (Namibia) and Cybernetica AS), Tunduk in Kyrgyzstan (with Aktors OÜ and the Kyrgyz Republic’s E-Governance Central Coordination Unit), Rahaka in Madagascar (with Madagascar’s Unité de Gouvernance Digitale and the World Bank Group), Data Exchange Platform in Benin (with Agency of Information Services and Cybernetica AS), Heldin in the Faroe Islands (with the Government of the Faroe Islands), and NRDEX in Bangladesh (with the Government of Bangladesh).

eGA has also contributed to developing digital identity solutions and trust services in Ukraine, which includes harmonising Ukrainian trust services with EU eIDAS requirements. The organisation is supporting Bangladesh's establishment of a single national identity.

=== Capacity Building and Training ===
eGA’s capacity-building work includes institutional development, training, and knowledge transfer related to digital government and services. Examples include:

- EU Member States - European Union-funded public administration reforms across multiple EU Member States, including Germany, the Czech Republic, and Croatia.
- Pacific Islands - Assessments of digital transformation readiness in Pacific Island countries in cooperation with Australia’s Cyber Cooperation Programme and the Australian Strategic Policy Institute.
- Western Balkans - including Montenegro, Serbia, and North Macedonia.
- Latin America - including Ecuador and Brazil.

=== Cybersecurity ===
eGA’s cybersecurity initiatives include cyber-preparedness assessments, institutional capacity-building, the development of national cybersecurity frameworks, and cybersecurity awareness-raising. Projects include EU-supported cyber resilience initiatives in the Western Balkans in collaboration with public institutions in Albania, Bosnia and Herzegovina, Kosovo, North Macedonia, Montenegro, and Serbia. As part of the EU Global Gateway Initiative, eGA has also supported Central Asian countries in strengthening their cybersecurity capacities and raising awareness of cyber hygiene and cybersecurity.

In December 2025, eGA, Cybexer, and NCSCC held a cybersecurity exercise for specialists from Ukraine's public and private sectors under the Tallinn Mechanism initiative.

eGA has also supported European Peace Facility cybersecurity projects with the armed forces and defence institutions of Ukraine and Moldova. As part of the Tallinn Mechanism, an international initiative to promote cyber resilience in Ukraine, eGA has provided training services to Ukrainian cyber experts.

=== Digital services and AI ===
eGA has developed digital public services for municipal and national governments, including AI implementation. This includes e-residency and e-entrepreneurship initiatives in Ukraine, as well as AI-integrated public services in Madrid.

== Initiatives ==
=== National Cybersecurity Index (NCSI) ===
eGA produces and maintains the National Cybersecurity Index (NCSI), a publicly available assessment of the cyber capacity and preparedness of over 150 countries. The index catalogues publicly available information and is updated on a continuous basis, and is used by policymakers and cybersecurity experts to assess national cyber preparedness and identify areas for improvement.

=== e-Governance Conference ===
Launched in 2015, eGA's annual conference brings together participants from academia, government, and industry to present digital governance research and solutions. Recent iterations have involved more than 300 participants from over 75 countries. Former speakers have included World Bank Group Chief Economist Indermit Gill, Ukrainian Minister of Defense Mykhailo Fedorov, and MIT Professor of Physics Max Tegmark.

=== Tallinn Cyber Diplomacy Summer School ===
Funded by the European Commission’s Directorate-General for International Partnerships (DG INTPA), the Tallinn Cyber Diplomacy Summer School is a week-long program aimed at emerging leaders in cybersecurity and digital governance. It selects roughly 60 diplomats and public servants each year from more than 50 countries. An associated Winter School, open only to Summer School alumni, is intended to facilitate long-term partnerships and collaboration between participating governments. The program takes place in a different global region each year.

== Notable People & Alumni ==
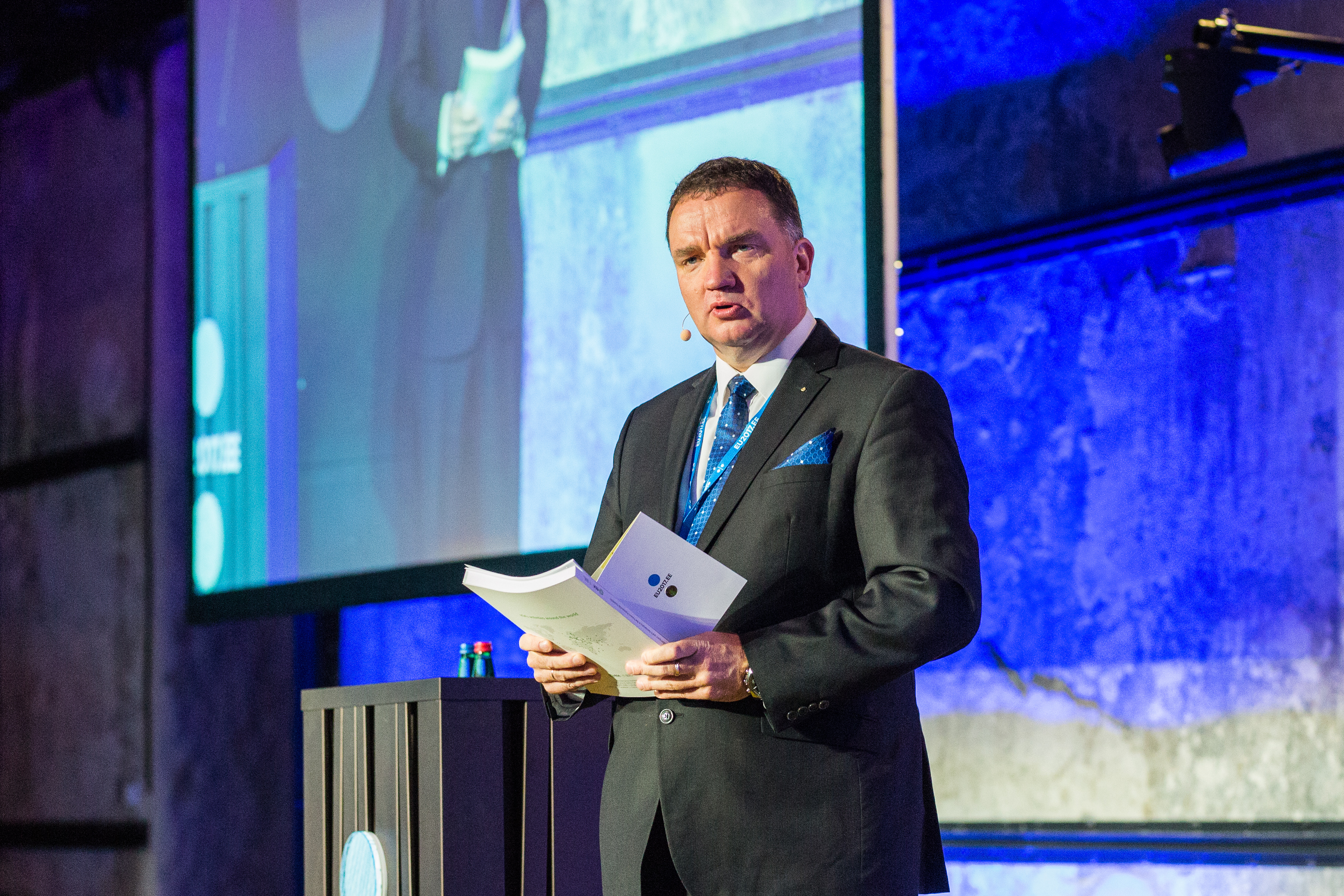
Hannes Astok, Chairman of the Board of eGA

eGA is governed by a supervisory board whose members have included former senior officials of Estonia, NATO, and the European Union. People associated with the organisation include:

- Toomas Hendrik Ilves, the fourth President of Estonia (2006-2016)
- Merle Maigre, former Director of NATO Cooperative Cyber Defence Centre of Excellence
- Jenik Radon, public international lawyer and adjunct professor at Columbia University in New York
- Taimar Peterkop, former Estonian Secretary of State
- Märt Kivine, Head of Partnerships at the World Bank’s Economic Development Institute
- Ines Mergel, Professor of Public Administration at the University of Konstanz
- Hannes Astok, former member of the Estonian Parliament
- Paul Timmers, former European Commission Director for Digital Society
- Linnar Viik, co-founder of eGA
- Uuno Vallner, Architect of Public Data Exchange Layer (DXL) of X-Road
- Liia Hänni, former member of the Estonian Parliament and astrophysicist
