= Digital Nations =

Intergovernmental organization focused on technology

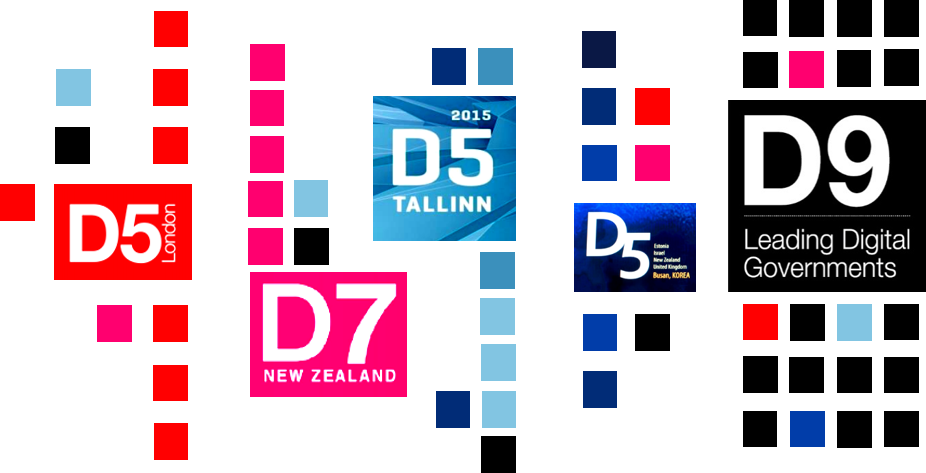

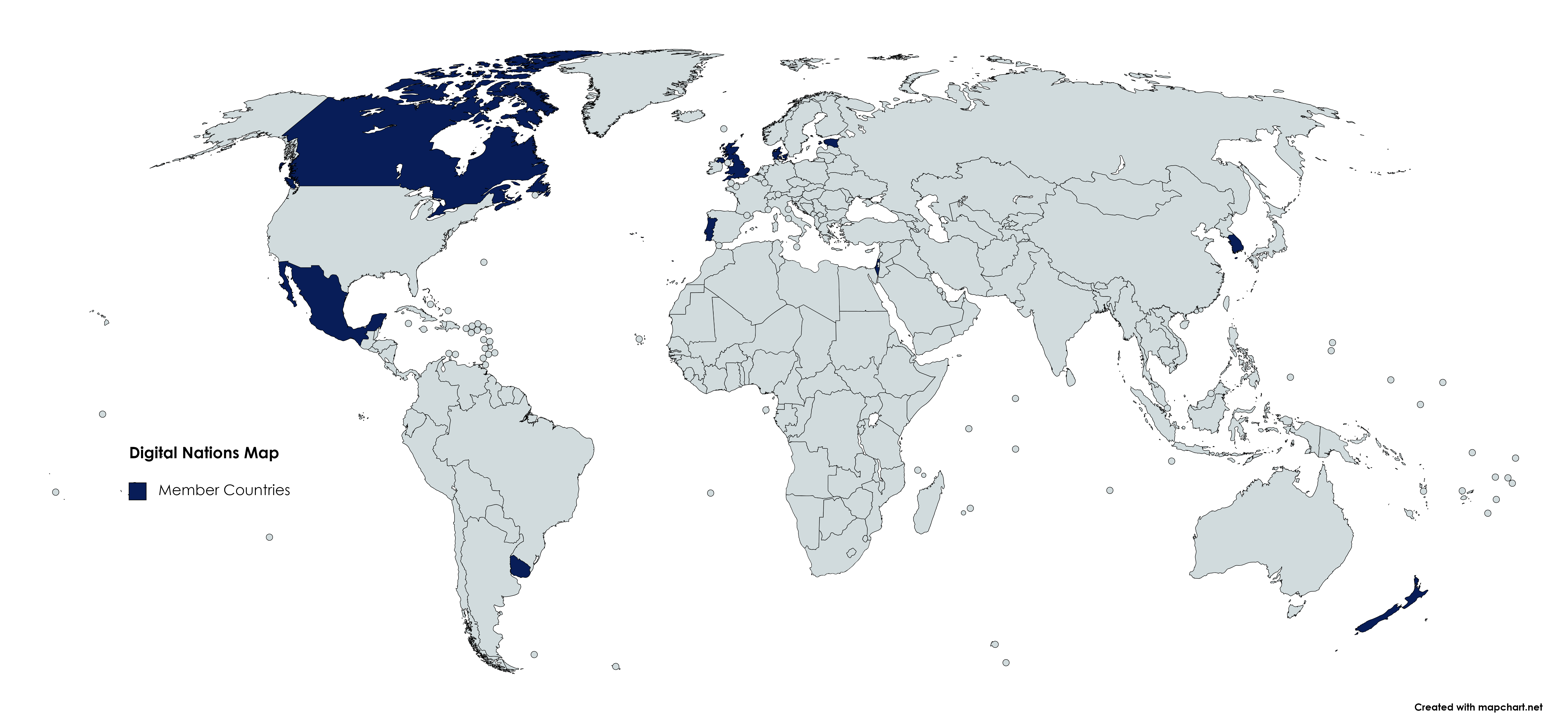
- Digital Nations map
- Founded: December 2014
- Type: International network
- Members: Canada; Denmark; Estonia; Israel; Mexico; New Zealand; Portugal; Republic of Korea; United Kingdom; Uruguay
- Website: https://www.digital-nations.org/

The Digital Nations or DN (previously the Digital 5, Digital 7 and Digital 9) is a collaborative network of the world's leading digital governments with a common goal of harnessing digital technology to improve citizens' lives. Members share world-class digital practices, collaborate to solve common problems, identify improvements to digital services, and support and champion the group's growing digital economies. Through international cooperation, the Digital Nations aims to identify how digital government can provide the most benefit to citizens. The group embodies minilateral engagement, where small groups of states cooperate on specific topics with a global impact.

== Members ==
Estonia, Israel, New Zealand, the Republic of Korea, and the United Kingdom are the founding members of the D5. In February 2018, Canada and Uruguay joined the group to form the D7. In November 2018, Mexico and Portugal joined to form the D9. Denmark joined as the tenth member of Digital Nations in November 2019.

The following government departments lead their country's engagement with the DN:

- Treasury Board of Canada Secretariat
- Agency for Digitisation, Danish Ministry of Finance
- Ministry of Economic Affairs and Communications of the Republic of Estonia
- National Digital Affairs Directorate in the Israeli Ministry of Economy in the Government of Israel
- National Digital Strategy Coordination, President's Office of the Government of Mexico
- Department of Internal Affairs of the Government of New Zealand
- Ministry for Modernisation of the State and Public Administration of the Government of Portugal
- Ministry of the Interior and Safety of the Government of the Republic of Korea
- Department for Digital, Culture, Media and Sport of the Government of the United Kingdom
- Agency for e-Government and Information Society at the President's Office of the Government of Uruguay

== Charter ==
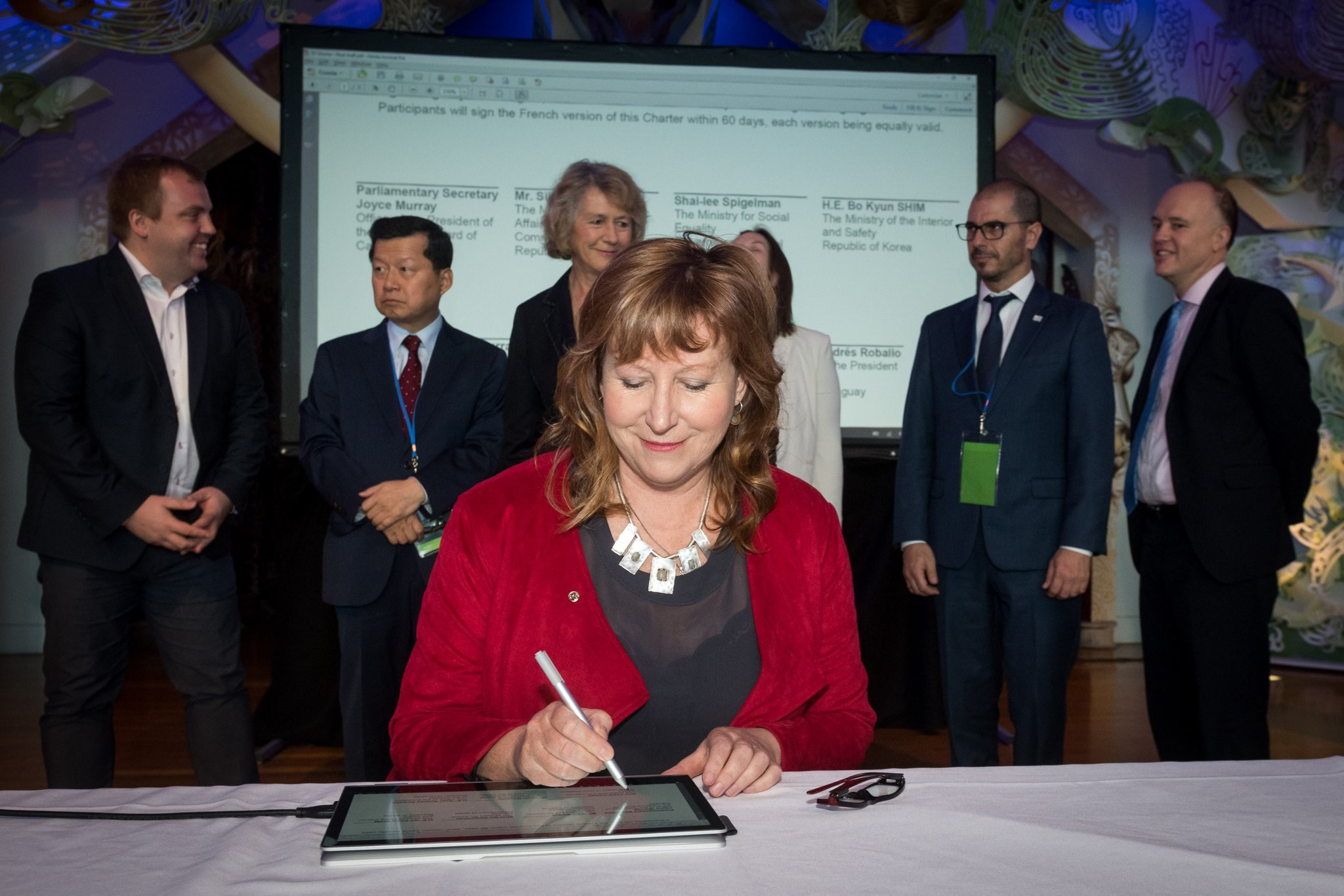
The signing of the D7 Charter in Wellington, New Zealand in 2018

In 2014, the founding members signed a charter committing to share and improve upon the participant nations' practices in digital services and digital economies. Updated to reflect a growing membership, the DN Charter outlines a mutual commitment to digital development and leadership through nine core principles:

1. User needs – the design of public services for the citizen
2. Open standards – a commitment to credible royalty-free open standards to promote interoperability
3. Open source – future government systems, tradecraft, standards and manuals are created as open source and are shareable between members
4. Open markets – in government procurement, create true competition for companies regardless of size. Encourage and support a start-up culture and promote growth through open markets
5. Open government (transparency) – be a member of the Open Government Partnership and use open licenses to produce and consume open data
6. Connectivity – enable an online population through comprehensive and high-quality digital infrastructure
7. Digital skills and confidence – support children, young people and adults in developing digital competencies and skills
8. Assisted digital – a commitment to support all its citizens to access digital services
9. Commitment to share and learn – all members commit to work together to help solve each other's issues wherever they can

The updated Charter was signed on 6 November 2019 in Montevideo, Uruguay.

== Meetings ==
The Digital Nations meets twice per year to showcase accomplishments in countries’ digital landscapes and co-create the next best practices. Members participate in political-level Ministerial Summits, hosted by the rotating chair nation, and working-level Officials Meetings.

Meeting	Location	Date	Themes	Outcomes
D5 Ministerial Summit	London, United Kingdom	9–10 December 2014	Teaching children to code; Open markets; Connectivity	Establishment of the Digital 5; Adoption of D5 Charter
D5 Ministerial Summit	Tallinn, Estonia	19–20 November 2015	E-Procurement; Digital trust; Service design; IT talent	
D5 Officials Meeting	Wellington, New Zealand	7–8 June 2016	—N/a	
D5 Ministerial Summit	Busan, Korea	10–11 November 2016	Innovation	Adoption of the Busan Declaration
D5 Officials Meeting	Jerusalem, Israel	21–23 November 2017	—N/a	
D7 Ministerial Summit	Wellington, New Zealand	21–22 February 2018	Digital rights	Canada and Uruguay officially join; Revision of D7 Charter
D7 Officials Meeting	London, United Kingdom	16–17 July 2018	—N/a	
D9 Ministerial Summit	Jerusalem, Israel	21–22 November 2018	AI and its public applications	Mexico and Portugal officially join; Revision of D9 Charter
D9 Officials Meeting	Lisbon, Portugal	3–4 July 2019	—N/a	
D9 Ministerial Summit	Montevideo, Uruguay	4–7 November 2019	Holistic approach to data in government	Denmark officially joins; Support for joint Data Declaration; Revision of DN Charter
DN Officials Meeting	Copenhagen, Denmark	June 2020	—N/a	Virtual meeting
DN Ministerial Summit	Ottawa, Canada	2-4 November 2020	Resilient and responsive service	Virtual meeting Adoption of updated DN Charter

=== D5 London 2014 ===
The first event of the D5 was held in London on 9 and 10 December 2014 with delegates from the five founding nations attending, as well as the United States, who were there as observers; the event was hosted by the UK's Cabinet Office minister Francis Maude. The UK's Culture, Communications and Creative Industries Minister Ed Vaizey and their chief technology officer Liam Maxwell were also present.

==== Themes ====
The 2014 summit had three themes: Teaching children to code, open markets, and connectivity.

===== Teaching children to code =====
By teaching children to code, the D5 intends to train the newest generation of kids – the "technology generation" – to take an active role in creating IT, rather than simply consuming it. Discussion points involving this theme included looking at whether simply changing the curriculum is enough to achieve this goal, methods that may be used to give teachers the skills to teach and inspire children to code, connecting the fields of industry and education so that such a change can be achieved, and ensuring gender balance and encouraging girls to take on tech roles.

Advances made by the D5's participating countries have already been made to achieve this goal. In the UK, England became the first country in the world to mandate that coding be taught to all pupils aged 5 to 16; In Estonia, primary schools have been teaching students to code since the 1990s; In New Zealand, they have introduced a set of Digital Technology Guidelines that will allow secondary schools to teach the subject coherently – they have also invested in new graduate ICT training schools to transition tertiary students into the workforce; in Israel they have "the most rigorous computer science high school programme in the world" due to a major review of computing at school that took place in the 1990s; South Korea teaches some computer science in school and also offers an optional online course for those who are interested.

===== Open markets =====
The focus of open markets is to open bidding on government IT contracts to small and medium-sized enterprises (SMEs) through the use of digital marketplaces such as the UK Government's G-cloud. The benefit of this to the government is to reduce costs by contracting out to the company that can provide the best value for money spent. The reduced barriers provided by an open market give SMEs who may not have been previously considered for a government contract, or who have never bid on one before, a fairer and more seamless opportunity to do so. Moving away from large outsourcers requires right sizing, which in this case can be achieved by buying parts of contracts from several smaller suppliers rather than buying one large contract from a single supplier, using agile delivery, buying cloud services, and building in-house engineering and operations capability.

Like the UK's G-cloud, New Zealand is also building a government cloud programme to ease the process of government buying from SMEs. They are committed to using 'as a service' products to open up the market. South Korea too has already built an e-procurement system that allows SMEs the opportunity to win government contracts. Since its inception, it has saved $8 billion annually and made a reduction of 7.8 million pages of paper documents per year. Bidding time has been reduced from thirty hours to two.

===== Connectivity =====
With an increasing number of internet connected devices in each household, the D5 intends to look at what type of infrastructure is needed to maintain and expand connectivity, as well as how they can work together to share each other's experiences and to develop standards together. Citing a Cisco figure, the D5 expects over 50 billion internet connected devices to be in use around the world by 2020, with as many as dozens of each device in every household.

To meet these needs, the UK government's focus will be on Machine to Machine technology, the Internet of Things and 5G mobile networks. In March 2014, they announced they will be investing £45 million in the Internet of Things. They have set up smart cities demonstrators in Glasgow, London, Bristol and Peterborough, and their 5G Innovation Centre is the world's first dedicated 5G testbed centre. In a speech during the summit, Cabinet Minister Francis Maude announced that the UK intends to have 97% of all citizen interactions with the state online by the end of the next parliament. In Estonia they have X-Road, a secure platform-independent Internet-based data exchange layer that provides transparent digital services with minimum costs. Through a public-private partnership, New Zealand is in the process of upgrading internet infrastructure to fibre-optic cables. Korea too has made a significant investment into The Internet of Things.

==== Events ====
There were a number of events and presentations held throughout the city. The Duke of York hosted an event for the delegates at Buckingham Palace, where 100 UK digital startups showcased their products to attendees. Presenters included Crowd Emotion, Code Kingdoms, Therapy Box, Yoyo, Skyscape, Kano, and Relative Insight. Another event highlighted the D5's intention of teaching programming to children of young ages by having the BBC lead a group of 11-year-olds through a coding session in which they utilised a Doctor Who themed game to gain a basic understanding of the practice of computer programming.

== Future ==
The group expanded rapidly from five to ten members, with other countries signalling their interest in joining the Digital Nations. In the interest of strengthening capacity of the DN network, the Steering Committee agreed to establish a Secretariat to work on behalf of all DN countries in support of the group's key priorities. The DN Secretariat was introduced at the 5th Ministerial Summit in Israel in November 2018.

== See also ==
- E-democracy
- e-Estonia
- E-governance
- Government by algorithm
- Open data
- Open data in the United Kingdom
- Open-source governance
- Transformational government
