= Cybernetica (Estonian company) =

IT research and development company based in Estonia

Cybernetica AS
- Industry: Future-proof technology
- Founded: May 12, 1997; 27 years ago in Tallinn, Estonia
- Headquarters: Estonia
- Website: cyber.ee

Cybernetica is an Estonian company best known for development of Estonia's e-Estonia X-Road and Internet voting system. Established in 1997 as Küberneetika AS, it is a successor of the applied research unit of the Institute of Cybernetics of the Academy of Sciences of Estonia, established in 1960.
