= EstWin =

2010s telecommunication project in Estonia

Estonian Wideband Infrastructure (EstWin or EstWIN) is a project undertaken by Estonia to make 100 Mbit/s wideband internet accessible to every citizen of Estonia by 2015. The development project will be supervised by the Estonian Broadband Development Foundation, which was founded by the Ministry of Economic Affairs and Communications and the Estonian Association of Information Technology and Telecommunications (ITL) on 11 August 2009. The total cost of the EstWin project is estimated to be 6 billion Estonian kroons (384 million Euros), a quarter of which is expected to come from the structural funds of European Union. This makes EstWin the biggest project ever signed between the public and private sectors of Estonia.

EstWin has been undertaken first and foremost for economic growth. Several studies have reached the conclusion that a 10% increase in the broadband connection coverage in a country will increase the gross national product by 1.2–1.5%. Development of broadband Internet connections will improve the competitiveness of regions and the country as well as improving the quality of life of people and increasing the productivity by up to 50%.

In the first stage of EstWin, 6,640 kilometres (4,130 mi) of fiber-optic cables of base network will be installed and more than 1,400 connection points will be constructed by 2012. The aim is to have 98% of the residential houses, businesses and authorities located closer than 1.5 km (0.93 mi) from the nearest connection point. This stage of the project will give work to 400 people and will cost an estimated 1.5 billion kroons (96 million Euros), most of which will come from European structure funds. The network connection will reach the end user from the network access point either by fiber-optic or existing copper cable; in difficult cases a wireless connection will be used.

In years 2012–2015, the data transfer speeds will be increased, so that the end users connected through the fiber-optic cabling will get speeds up to 2.5 gigabits, those with copper a speed of up to a 100 megabits and those connecting through wireless at either 42 or 100 megabits per second depending on the technology.

Led by the Estonian Broadband Development Foundation and supported by the Estonian Association of Information Technology and Telecommunications (ITL), the EstWin broadband infrastructure network seeks to provide high-speed connectivity to rural areas in Estonia.

Building on the EstWin project's objective to expand high-speed internet access across Estonia, the nation has continued to integrate its digital infrastructure with sustainable energy solutions. A key development in this integration is the European Investment Bank's investment of €180 million in 2023 in the Sopi-Tootsi onshore wind farm. As Estonia's largest wind energy project, comprising 38 wind turbines, the Sopi-Tootsi farm is set to significantly contribute to the national energy supply. Expected to provide 8.5% of Estonia's total electricity and meet 40% of household electricity needs, this investment will support Estonia’s path towards decarbonisation and energy independence. It also aligns with the European Union's goals for climate action and sustainable growth.

Estonia's digital infrastructure has seen significant advancement due to the EstWin project, as highlighted in the European Commission's 'Digital Economy and Society Index (DESI) 2022'. Ranked 9th among EU nations for digital performance, Estonia demonstrates a high engagement in e-Government services with nearly 90% of citizens utilizing these services. Despite this, the country faces challenges in 5G deployment, ranking 26th within the EU. In contrast the substantial coverage of Very High Capacity Networks (VHCN) in Estonia signifies progress in extending high-speed internet infrastructure, aligning with the key objectives of the EstWin project. This advancement is part of Estonia's broader digital strategy, outlined in the Estonian Digital Agenda 2030, which focuses on enhancing cybersecurity and digital services.

== See also ==
- Tiigrihüpe
- Cooperative Cyber Defence Centre of Excellence
