= Telia Eesti =

Company based in Estonia

Telia Eesti AS

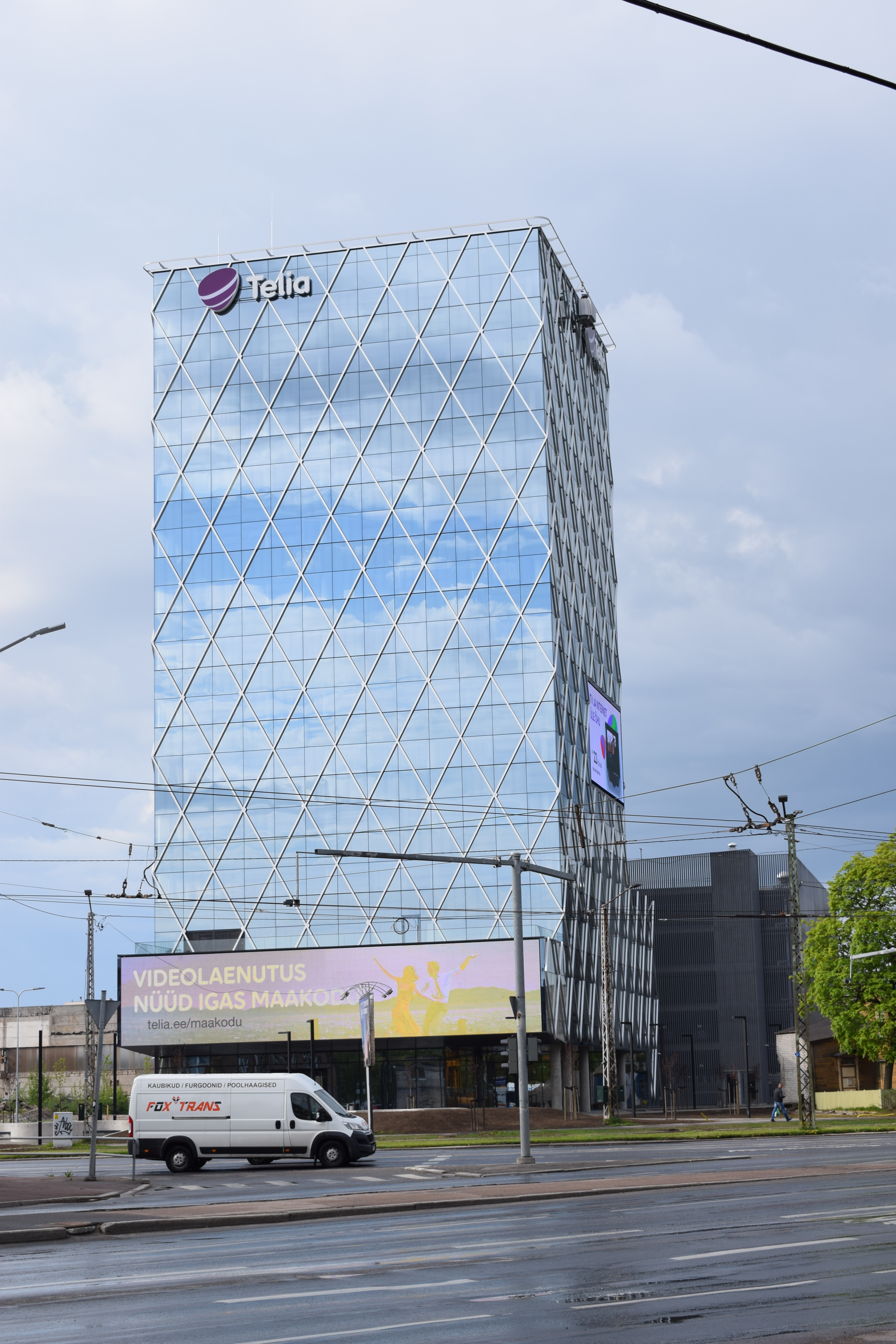
- Telia Eesti headquarters in Tallinn
- Type: Aktsiaselts (privately held)
- Industry: Telecommunications, information technology, entertainment
- Predecessor: AS Eesti Telekom; EMT; Elion
- Founded: 16 April 1991; 35 years ago Registered in the Estonian Commercial Register on 5 August 1997; renamed Telia Eesti in 2016
- Headquarters: Mustamäe tee 3, Tallinn, Estonia
- Area served: Estonia
- Key people: Andre Visse (CEO)
- Products: Mobile telephony Home internet TV and streaming IT solutions
- Revenue: €363.2 million (2025)
- Owner: Telia Company AB (100%)
- Number of employees: c. 1,300 (2025)
- Parent: Telia Company
- ASN: 3249
- Website: www.telia.ee

Telia Eesti AS (formerly AS Eesti Telekom) is one of the largest telecommunication companies in the Baltic States and member of Telia Company. AS Eesti Telekom is a holding company registered and operating in the Republic of Estonia, whose subsidiaries provide telecommunications services.

The company, founded in 1991 after the restoration of independence of Estonia, took over the existing government telephone network. The company started with a copper cable network from the Soviet Russian period and a long list of people who were waiting for a telephone connection. Equipped with an eight-year monopoly, the company invested in building a new telephone network. In the 1990s there was an entry into the Internet with the NETI search engine, internet access under the ATLAS brand and email at hot.ee. When the monopoly ended in the landline in 2000, telephone services were positioned under ET on the competition market.

Eesti Telekom changed its name to Telia Eesti in 2016.

Estonian mobile operator EMT and broadband operator Elion have merged their functions and are known as AS Eesti Telekom since August 2014.

AS Eesti Telekom is not directly involved in commercial operations, and its profit accumulates mainly from the profits of other companies in the group. In 2008 the net sales of the Eesti Telekom Group totalled 6,190 million kroons, a decrease of 1% over the year. The group's net profit was 1,438 million kroons.

Telia Eesti is a member of Estonian Association of Information Technology and Telecommunications.

The share capital of AS Eesti Telekom consists of 137,954,528 of ordinary shares with a nominal value of 10 kroons each The company's ordinary shares are divided among shareholders in the following manner:

- Telia Company AB 137,954,529 shares 100%

Former Eesti Telekom logo used until 2016
