= Tiigrihüpe =

Project to develop computer and network infrastructure in Estonia

Logo of Tiigrihüpe

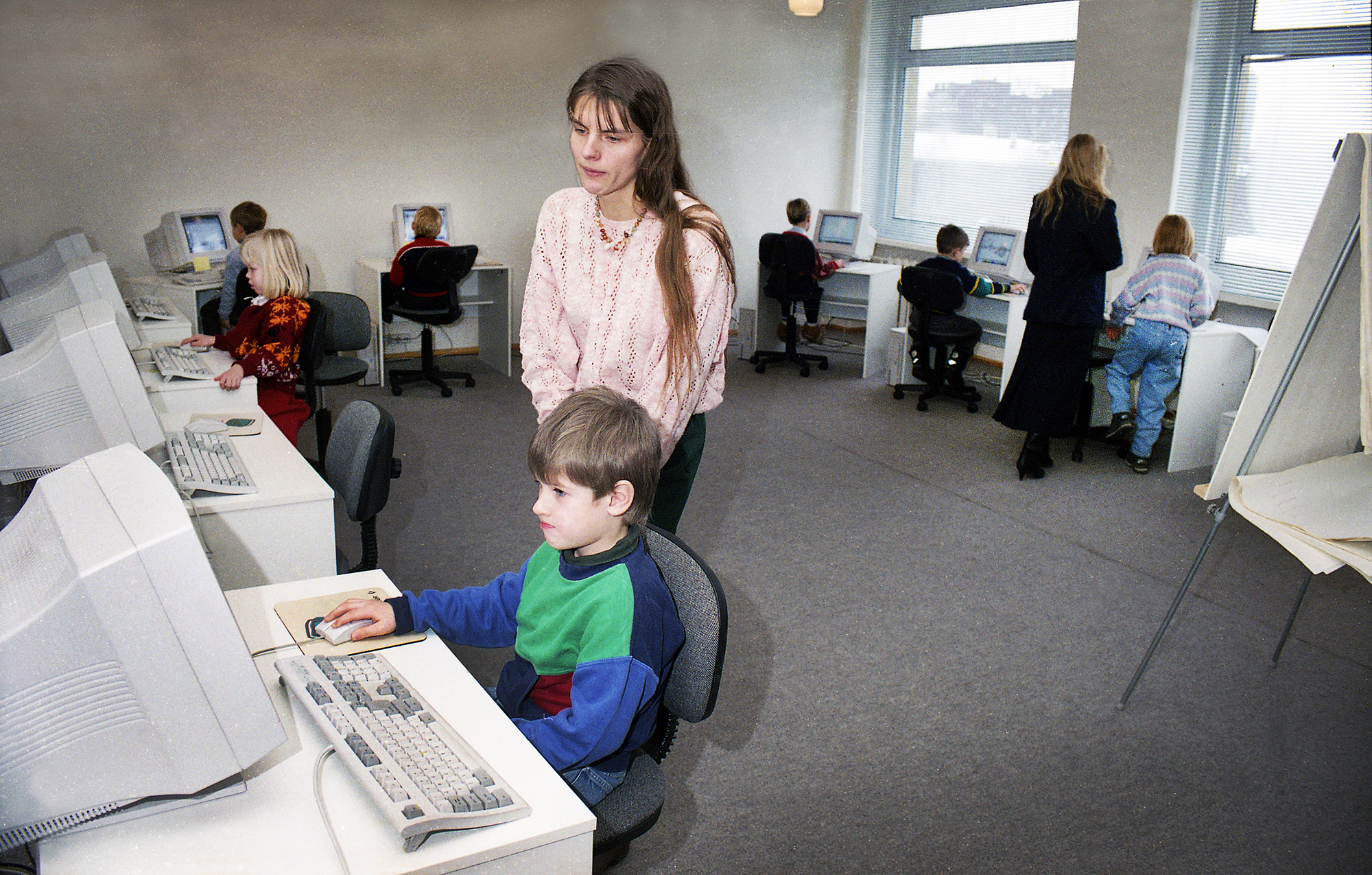
Computer class in Estonia in 1996

Tiigrihüpe (Estonian for Tiger Leap) was a project undertaken by the Republic of Estonia to heavily invest in development and expansion of computer and network infrastructure in Estonia, with a particular emphasis on education. The project was first proposed in 1996 by Toomas Hendrik Ilves, then ambassador of Estonia to United States and later President of Estonia, and Jaak Aaviksoo, then minister of Education. The project was announced by Lennart Meri, the President of Estonia, on 21 February 1996. Funds for the foundation of Tiigrihüpe were first allocated in national budget of 1997.

An important primary effect of the project was rollout of Internet access to all Estonian schools, which effectively ended UUCP usage in Estonia, combined with updating computer labs in all schools to use IBM PC compatible Wintel computers, where Estonian CP/M based school computer Juku introduced in 1988 was still widely used. Although outdated for 1990s, Jukus did enable Estonia to "gain a head start in mass school computerization" by providing early access to computers and a standardized study environment.

After the cyberattacks on Estonia in 2007, Estonia combined network defence with its common military doctrine. Success of the process led to NATO creating the NATO Cooperative Cyber Defence Centre of Excellence in Tallinn. This project has been nicknamed Tiger Defence (Estonian: Tiigrikaitse) by analogy with Tiigrihüpe.

In 2012, two more programs for technology education were launched in Estonia. Firstly, the ProgeTiiger program to improve technological literacy and digital competence of teachers and students, and IT Academy – a cooperation and development program between the state, the ICT sector companies and universities aimed to improve the quality of higher ICT education.

== See also ==
- Noored Kooli, a project to increase the number of teachers in Estonia
- Estonica, a project on creating an Estonian encyclopædia partially funded through Tiigrihüpe
- EstWin, a project to connect all Estonians to internet with 100 Mbit/s speed by 2015
- e-Estonia
- Internet in Estonia
