= Tehnopol =

Science and business park in Tallinn

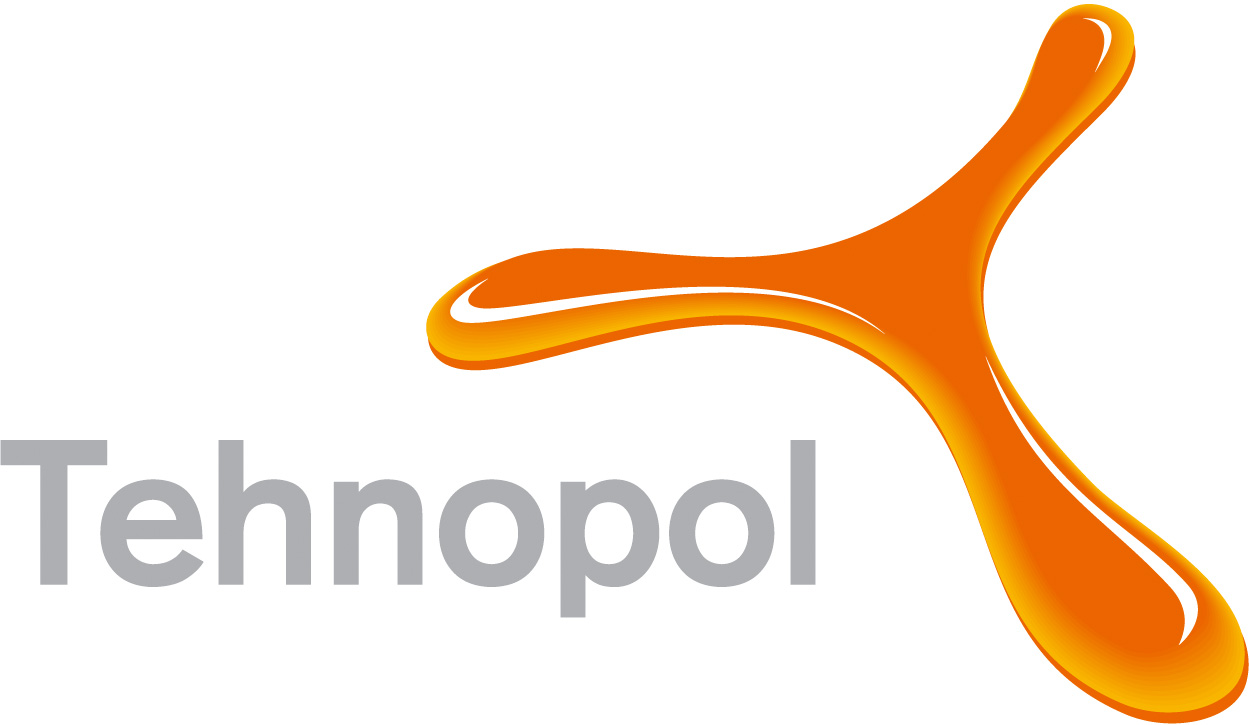
Logo of Tehnopol

Tehnopol (also Tallinn Technology Park) is science and business park in Tallinn, Estonia.

Tehnopol is the biggest science park in the Baltic states. One of the main goal for Tehnopol is to help startup and small and medium-sized enterprises (SMEs) to grow faster.

Tehnopol's history began in 1998 when Tallinn University of Technology Innovation Centre Foundation was established. The goal of the foundation was to establish Tallinn Technology Park. In 2001, the park was established.

Tehnopol is home for companies like Skype, Cybernetica, Starship Technologies, Ektaco, and SMIT. In total, over 200 companies are located in Tehnopol.
