= Noored Kooli =

Project to mitigate teacher shortage in Estonia

Noored Kooli (Estonian for Young people to schools) is an Estonian educational leadership program to address the critical teacher shortage in Estonia, drawing inspiration from a similar scheme, Teach First, in the United Kingdom. This solution recruits recent university/college graduates and early-career professionals to teach in schools facing shortages. Launched on February 6, 2006, Noored Kooli aims to place 10-15 exceptional Estonian graduates into the schools that need them the most for a minimum of a 2 year placement. The program also provides a pre-placement training, ongoing mentoring and additional stipends alongside regular teacher salaries. A complete and comprehensive training program takes place at Tallinn University.

== History ==
Noored Kooli was created in the mid-2000s as a national response to teacher shortages in Estonia. Sources differ slightly on the exact start date: Swedbank and the Good Deed Foundation (Heateo) say the program was founded in 2006, while other institutional profiles and case studies record the first cohort entering schools in September 2007.

== Organization and partnerships ==
Noored Kooli is organized as a foundation and has worked with corporate and philanthropic partners and sponsors, including Swedbank and Heateo (Good Deed) since its founding; other supporters over time have included corporate sponsors and impact funds. The program is also listed as a local partner in the global Teach For All network.

== See also ==
- New York City Teaching Fellows
- Teach for America
- Tiigrihüpe
