= Liam Maxwell =

British technology executive and public servant (born 1968)

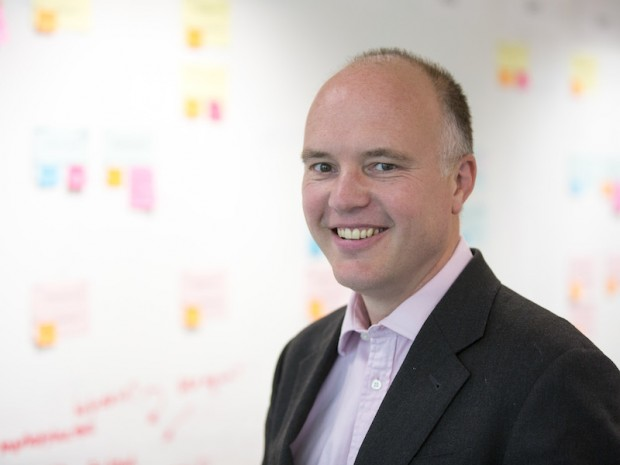

UK Chief Technology Officer, Government Digital Service
- In office December 2012 – April 2016
- Prime Minister: David Cameron
- Minister: Francis Maude (until 2015); Oliver Letwin (from 2015)

UK National Technology Adviser
- In office April 2016 – 9 August 2018
- Prime Minister: David Cameron; Theresa May
- Minister: Matt Hancock (Minister for the Cabinet Office) & Ed Vaizey (Minister for the Digital Economy)

Personal details
- Born: June 1968 (age 58) Nairobi, Kenya
- Citizenship: United Kingdom
- Party: Conservative
- Education: University of Oxford (MA)

Liam Maxwell (born June 1968) is a British technology executive and public servant. He was the Director of Government Transformation for Amazon Web Services until March 2026.

First serving as a Conservative councillor for the Royal Borough of Windsor and Maidenhead in 2007, Maxwell was the UK's first National Technology Adviser from April 2016 to August 2018. He was then the UK's first Chief Technology Officer (CTO) as part of the Government Digital Service from December 2012 until April 2016.

== Early life ==
Maxwell was born June 1968, in Nairobi, Kenya to a mother who was a nurse with the Flying Doctors and a father who was a health officer in the Nairobian government. Maxwell's family moved to the UK in 1970 where he was educated and boarded at Christ's Hospital.

Maxwell was educated at New College, Oxford and graduated with an MA in Human Sciences in 1991.

== Government career ==
Maxwell was elected in 2007 as a councillor for the Royal Borough of Windsor and Maidenhead and helped develop David Cameron's Big Society project.

Maxwell was a technology policy adviser to the Conservative Party in the run-up to the general election in 2010, helping write their manifesto.

In June 2011, after the coalition government's formation, Maxwell was appointed as advisor on "ICT futures" to the Efficiency and Reform Group for eleven months, having been had been offered the position by Ian Watmore. Maxwell started the job in September while on sabbatical from a position as Head of Computing Science at Eton College. Maxwell worked in the Cabinet Office under John Suffolk as Government Chief Information Officer and Ian Watmore as Chief Operating Officer of the Efficiency and Reform Group .

Maxwell was asked to stay on permanently by Francis Maude in November/December, leading to Maxwell leaving his Eton position and becoming a civil servant.

During his time as an adivsor, Maxwell pushed for the government to use more small and medium enterprises as suppliers, and to use more open source software.

In April 2012, Maxwell was appointed the new deputy government chief information officer (CIO), following the departure of Bill McCluggage, and now worked under Andy Nelson. In December 2012, the remaining IT functions in the ERG were merged with the parallel Government Digital Service. As part of this, Maxwell was appointed as the UK Government's Chief Technology Officer by Stephen Kelly; the role of Government Chief Information Officer was not transferred.

During his time in GDS, Maxwell established the Digital 5 group of the world's five leading digitally advanced governments, reformed technology spending controls under the "Technology Code of Practice", and led the Public Services Network, Crown Hosting Service and Digital Marketplace programmes. In 2014, he committed to staying in the role of CTO until at least 2018.

In April 2016, it was announced by the Cabinet Office that Maxwell would take on the new position of National Technology Adviser to Matt Hancock, Minister for the Cabinet Office and Ed Vaizey, Minister for the Digital Economy at the Department for Culture, Media and Sport. In August 2018 the department confirmed that Maxwell was leaving the position in October 2018 to take a job at Amazon.

== Post-government career ==
Maxwell served as the Director of Government Transformation at Amazon Web Services from November 2018 until March 2026. Maxwell's role has included working with the Ukrainian government to help them download and move data out of the country after the 2022 Russian invasion of Ukraine.

In March 2026, Maxwell announced that he would be leaving his position at AWS.

== Elections contested ==
=== 2007 Windsor and Maidenhead Borough Council election ===
Eton and Castle
Party	Candidate	Votes	%	±%
Conservative	Liam Maxwell	283	52.9	+18.9
Liberal Democrats	Richard Pratt	198	37.0	−21.3
Labour	George Davidson	54	10.1	+2.4
Majority		85	15.9	
Turnout		535	38.6	+8.9
Conservative gain from Liberal Democrats		Swing		

== Personal life ==
Maxwell is a supporter of Southampton F.C. and Hampshire Cricket Club. He also has a sister.

Government offices
Preceded by Bill McCluggage	Deputy Chief Information Officer, UK Government; June–December 2012	Post abolished
New title	UK Chief Technology Officer, Government Digital Service; 2012–2016	Succeeded by Andy Beale (acting)
New title	National Technology Adviser, Cabinet Office; 2016–2018	Post abolished
