= Estonica =

Estonian encyclopedia

Estonica is a comprehensive encyclopaedia on topics relating to Estonia, particularly the culture and history of Estonia.

The project has been developed by Estonian Institute since 2000. It is sponsored by, among others, Tiigrihüpe.

Materials of Estonica are available in Estonian as well as Russian and English, and are reusable under the terms of the Creative Commons Attribution-NonCommercial-ShareAlike license.
