= E-Estonia =

Digital society of Estonia

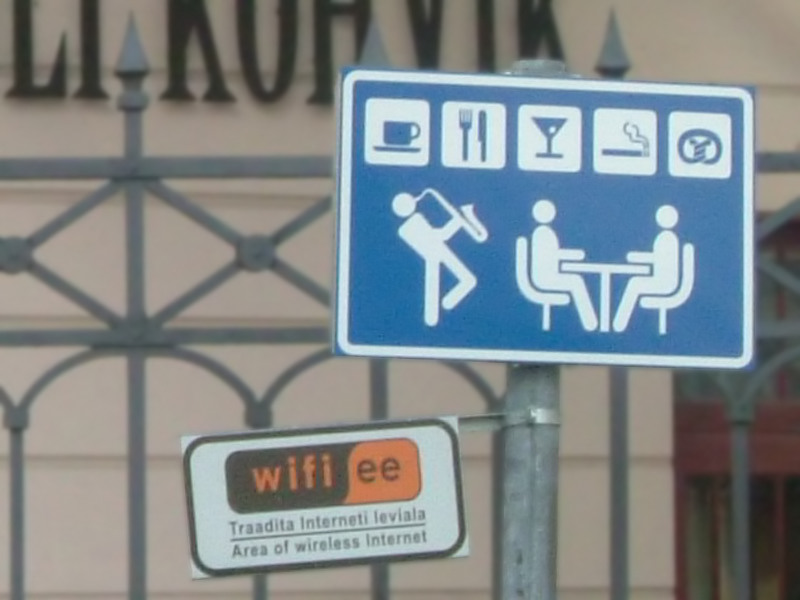
A sign denoting a Wi-Fi access point in Tartu, Estonia

e-Estonia refers to the digital society of Estonia, which facilitates its citizens' and residents' interactions with the state through the use of ICT solutions. Estonian e-services created under this initiative include e-Tax Board, e-Business, e-Banking, e-Ticket, e-School, University via the internet, the e-Governance Academy, i-Voting, as well as the release of several mobile applications. According to the goals set in Estonia's Digital Agenda 2030, the country aims to assure that high-speed internet is available across the country, the digital government services are the best in the world, and the country's cyberspace is reliable and safe by 2030.

== History ==
After the Estonian Restoration of Independence in 1991, the country was faced with the necessity to build a new technology infrastructure with very few resources, while trying to catch up with the West as quickly as possible. Most of the existing infrastructure was Soviet legacy; less than half of the Estonian population even had a phone line. The first Prime minister Mart Laar and his government saw this as an opportunity to build low-cost, cutting-edge systems based on accessibility and efficiency He pushed the country through a period of modernization, establishing the foundation needed to bring the country into the digital age. In 1992, Finland offered Estonia their old analogue telephone exchange for free, as they were replacing it with digital connections. Laar refused this donation and decided Estonia would build its own digital system. As a result, people went from having no phone connections to buying cell phones, causing Estonia to leapfrog the analogue world altogether.

In 1994, Estonia started drafting its first IT development strategy, the "Principles of Estonian Information Policy", which was approved by the Estonian parliament four years later. This strategy created permanent funding of 1% of GDP for IT, making developing IT solutions unaffected by political uncertainties.

One of the main cornerstones for the Estonian digitalization success story was the Tiigrihüpe (Estonian for Tiger Leap) programme initiated in 1996 by the then Estonian Ambassador to the United States, later President of Estonia, Toomas Hendrik Ilves, and the then Minister of Education, Jaak Aaviksoo. The idea of this project was to heavily invest in the development and expansion of computer and network infrastructure in Estonia through public-private partnerships, with a particular emphasis on education. As a result, by 1997, 97% of Estonian schools had an internet connection.

The next major developments in the Estonian digitalization journey were the establishment of the first e-banking services and e-cabinet for the government in 1996, the opportunity for Estonians to declare their taxes online through the e-tax authority since 2000, and most importantly, the creation of Estonian X-Road.

== Technology ==
The technology underpinning Estonian digital society is the distributed data exchange layer for registers and information systems called X-Road (X-Tee). The X-Road project draft was submitted and the data exchange was set up in 2001, however, the initial discussions started as early as 1998. The first actual steps were taken in 2000 when, on the initiative of the advisor to the Prime Minister, Linnar Viik, the X-tee pilot project was initiated. The funding came from the budgets of the Ministry of Transport and Communications, Ministry of the Interior, and the Government Office, coordinated by the state information system department (RISO) of the Ministry of Economic Affairs. The main idea, in addition to providing a safe data exchange platform and avoid leaking sensitive personal was to create one central unit where Estonian citizens would be able to both receive and give information, government's officials could use just one central state database and entrepreneurs would have the possibility to use the information in state databases for the benefits of their business. Today, the X-Road has become the backbone of e-Estonia, allowing the nation's public and private sector information systems to link up and operate in harmony. 99% of public services are accessible online 24/7. There has been controversy around the actual use of blockchain technology in X-Road and e-Estonia, which appeared in news outlets and was later denied by the Nordic Institute for Interoperability Solutions, which audited X-Road. Other parts of e-Estonia have been also analyzed with doubts about its claimed use of blockchain technology.

== Services ==
In 2002, Estonia created a digital identification system, based on the mandatory ID card. The e-Identity system means that all Estonian nationals and residents, regardless of location, have a state-issued electronic identity, called eID which enables them to interact with the state and use all of its services. People use their eIDs to pay bills, vote online, sign contracts, shop, access their health information, and much more. In 2017, a Czech research team found a vulnerability in the physical chips used in many of the eID cards to establish identity, leading to the cards being temporarily locked. According to the Estonian State Information System Authority, exploiting the vulnerability would not have been easy or inexpensive, and there were no known cases of successful exploitation of the ID card or similar chips. In fact, no such cases were known by the time Estonia revoked the affected certificates.

In 2014, Estonia became the first country to offer electronic residency to people from outside the country, a step that the Estonian government terms as "moving towards the idea of a country without borders." The program, called e-Residency, is meant for anyone who wishes to become an e-resident of Estonia and access its diverse digital services, regardless of citizenship or location. Non-residents can apply to have a smart ID card issued to them by the state, providing the same access to Estonia's various electronic services that a physical resident would be given. Use of the card for authentication with these services requires a four-digit pin code. The card, in conjunction with a separate pin code, also allows e-residents to digitally sign documents over the internet, a practice that is legally binding anywhere in the EU. While e-residency provides access to these services, it does not grant physical residency, the right to enter the country, or the ability to use the smart ID card as physical identification or as a travel document. It does not imply any support from the Estonian government in obtaining electronic residence. It is also not a way to avoid paying taxes in the country of actual residence – instead, one becomes a taxpayer both in Estonia and in the country where one is a citizen and tax resident.

In the field of healthcare, Estonian paramedics have access to an e-ambulance app, which – via X-Road – allows medical personnel immediate access to patient medical records. The system is also used for telemedicine. Since 2010, e-prescription was established, nowadays 99% of medical prescriptions are handled online; routine refills can be issued without appointments. Since 2020, Proactive Child Care was introduced, meaning that parents of a newborn no longer need to apply for benefits.

e-Estonia enabled electronic voting via the i-voting app, which used an I.D.-card-based system to cast ballots remotely. In 2014, approximately one-third of all votes were cast using the app. Since 2000, Estonians have been able to declare taxes online. Now 98% of people declare their income electronically. In the year 2022, m-Parking was also established, which is a system that enables drivers to pay for city parking via mobile phone. In 2022, e-Cabinet meetings were introduced, which reduced government bureaucracy.

== See also ==
- Data embassy
- Digital 5
- Digital signature in Estonia
- Digital Single Market
- E-democracy
- E-governance
- E-residency of Estonia
