= Nordic Institute for Interoperability Solutions =

Non-profit organization

The Nordic Institute for Interoperability Solutions (NIIS) is a non-profit established in 2017 by Estonia and Finland, with the mission "to develop e-governance solutions...with the X-Road technology used nationwide in the Estonian X-tee and in the Finnish Suomi.fi Data Exchange Layer services". It is funded by both countries, with around 1M€ annually. In 2019, Iceland was invited as well, and later the Faroe Islands.

The NIIS manages, develops, verifies, and audits X-Road's source code; administers documentation, business and technical requirements; conducts development; develops and implements principles of licensing and distribution; provides second-line support for members, and engages in international cooperation. It also shares vendor training and certifications on its technology.

The institute has been coined as "a pioneer of cross-border e-governance solution" and "a key component of its digital diplomacy and digital foreign policy work", "unique in the world". In 2020, the Digital Public Goods Alliance found the X-Road technology managed by NIIS was found to be a digital public good in alignment with the Digital Public Goods Standard. Its CEO, Ville Sirviö, is often referenced in international publications.
