= Linnar Viik =

Estonian information scientist and scholar

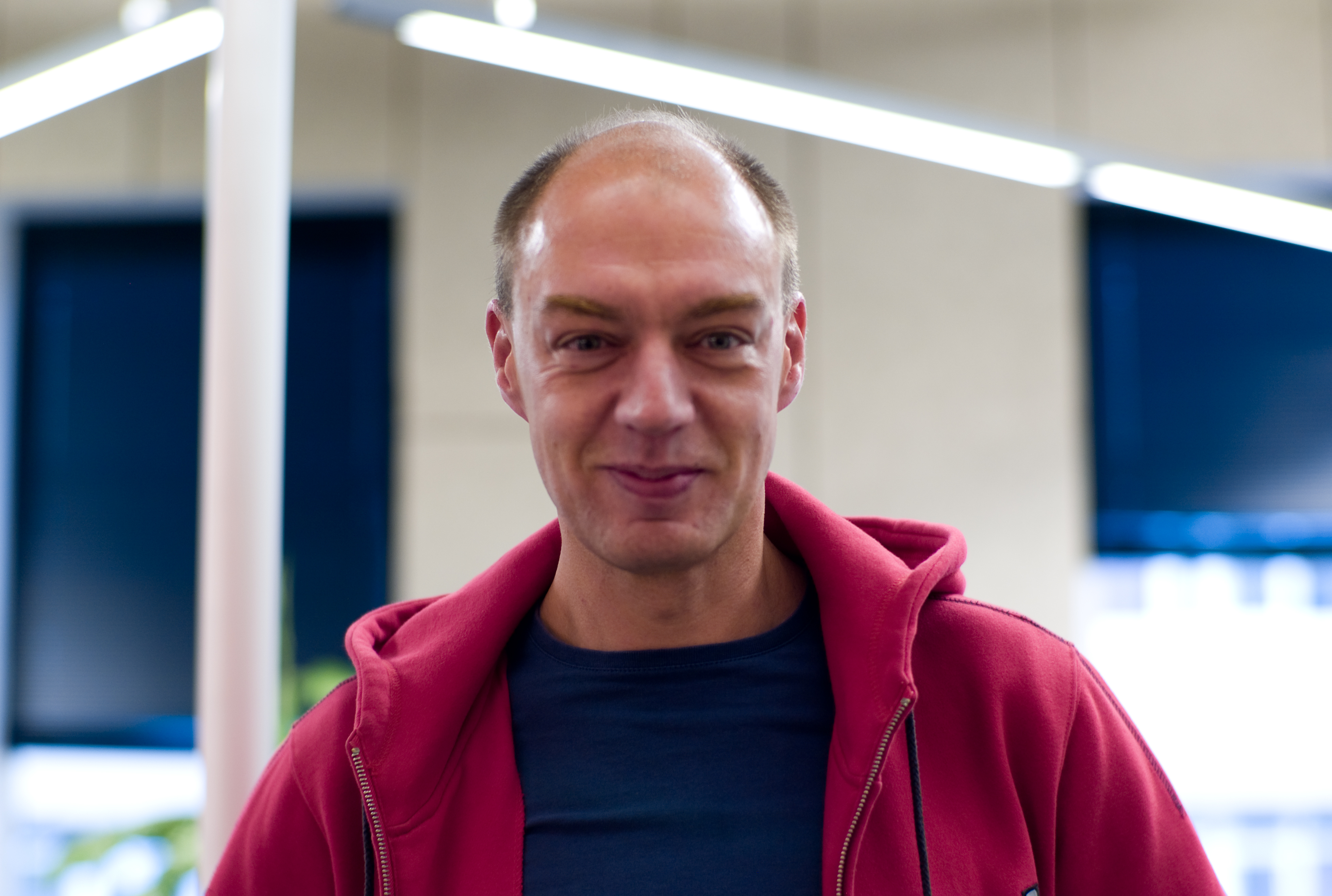
Linnar Viik at the Skype Tallinn office, 2007

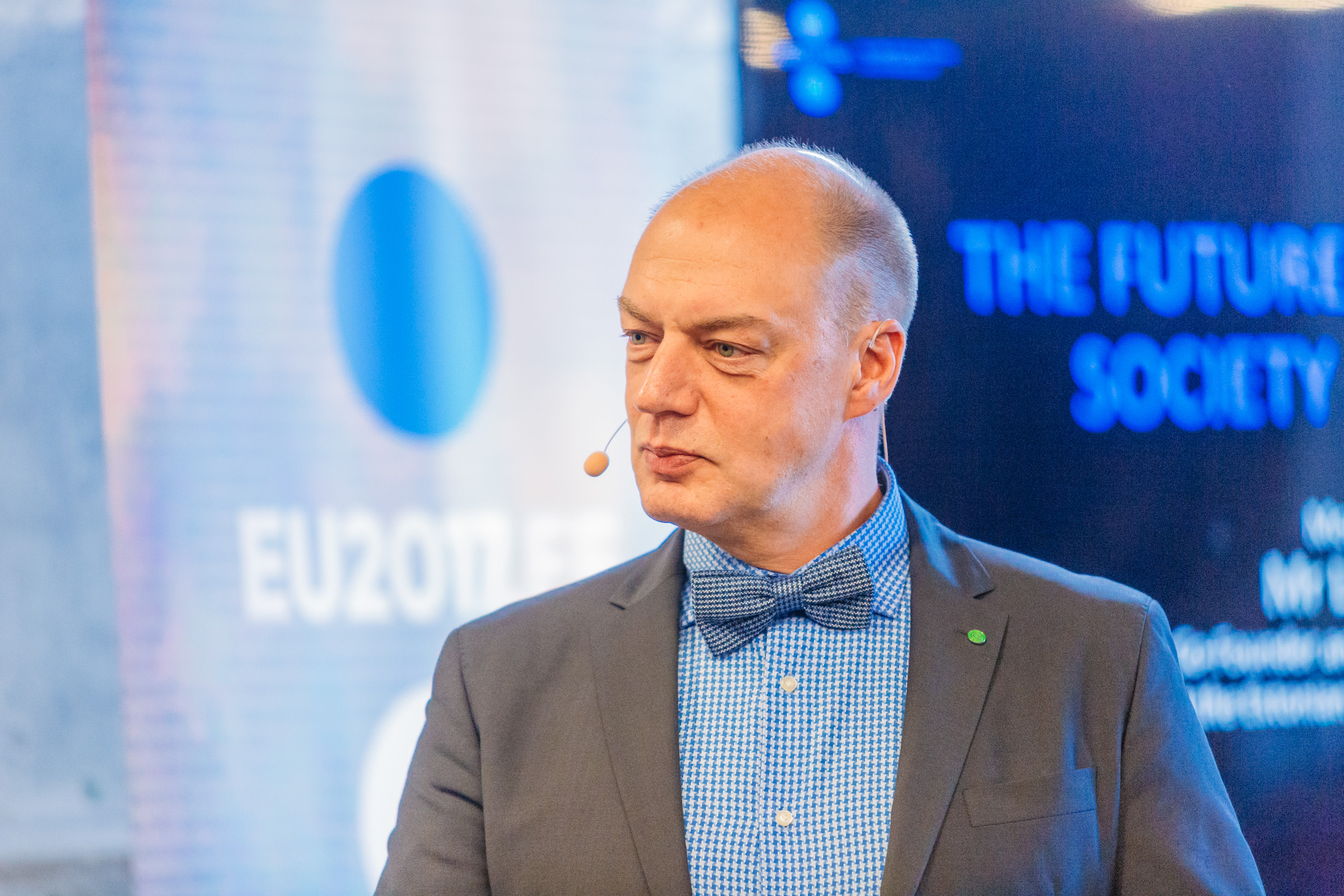
Linnar Viik in 2017

Linnar Viik (born 26 February 1965 in Tallinn) is an Estonian information technology scientist, entrepreneur and IT visionary. Since the 1990s, he has been one of the figures involved in shaping Estonia's information society.

Viik's current work focuses on digital governance, artificial intelligence and education. He is a cofounder and Programme Director of Smart Governance at the Estonian e-Governance Academy, a member of the Eesti.ai Advisory Board, and a cofounder and member of the supervisory board of the AI Leap Foundation. Through the e-Governance Academy, he has advised governments on digital strategy, institutional capacity and digital transformation.

He also serves as a member of the NATO Advisory Group on Emerging and Disruptive Technologies and the Supervisory Board of SEI Tallinn. In 2022, he was appointed to the Digital Council of the President of Estonia. He previously served as a member of the Research and Development Council of Estonia.

Alongside these activities, Viik remains active in business, education and organisational governance. He is a partner and member of the management board of Mobi Solutions, chair of the supervisory board of AS Eesti Loto, and a member of the supervisory board of Kaamos Holding. He also works as a visiting lecturer at the University of Tartu, the Estonian Academy of Arts and Tallinn University.

From 2019 to 2024, Viik chaired the Supervisory Board of EIT Digital. His earlier private sector roles included serving as development director at Skype, holding an executive role at Fortumo, and cofounding the mobile banking company Pocopay.

Viik also served on the Business Advisory Group of the Nordic Investment Bank and the Governing Board of the European Institute of Innovation and Technology. He chaired the board of the Open Estonia Foundation and served on the advisory board of the Lisbon Council. He lectured at the Estonian IT College, served on its board and was appointed acting rector in 2010.

Viik's involvement in the development of Estonia's information society began in the 1990s. He was one of the original architects of the Tiger Leap programme, which introduced computers and internet access into Estonian schools. From 1999 to 2001, he advised the Prime Minister of Estonia on information technology, research and development.

Earlier in his career, Viik worked as a researcher at the Helsinki University of Technology, as a management consultant at KPMG, for the United Nations Development Programme, and held positions at the Stockholm Environment Institute.

== Cultural activities ==
Viik is a collector of pop art. In 2023, he founded the PoCo Pop and Contemporary Art Museum in Tallinn's Rotermann Quarter, based largely on his own art collection. Since 2024, PoCo has hosted several international immersive exhibitions in Tallinn, including The Mystery of Banksy: A Genius Mind, Da Vinci Genius, The Art of the Brick and a Van Gogh immersive exhibition.

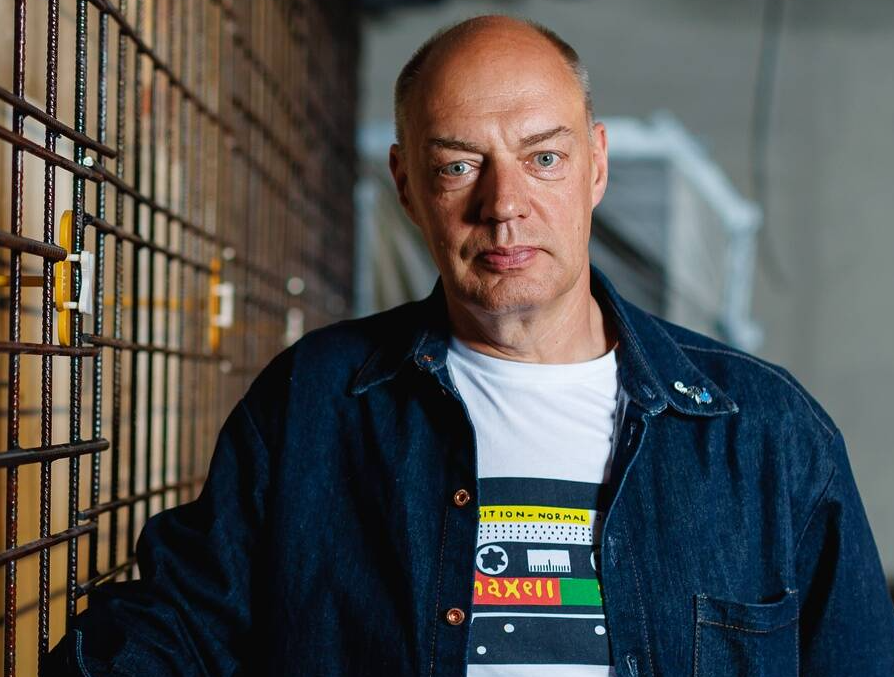
Linnar Viik at PoCo museum, 2024

Viik is also a member of the Digital Cultural Heritage Council of the Estonian Ministry of Culture, an advisory body concerned with the digitisation, accessibility and long-term preservation of Estonia's cultural heritage.

== Honours and awards ==
- 2026: Estonian Digital Visionary 2026 at the 2026 Digital Awards
- 2025: Tallinn Citizen of the Year
- Since 2025: Honorary Consul of the Republic of Maldives in Estonia
- 2014: Gold Badge of the University of Tartu Narva College
- 2013: Silver Badge of the Ministry of Foreign Affairs of Estonia
- 2006: Fifth Class of the Order of the White Star
- 2004: Finalist for the EV50 European of the Year award
- 2001: Person of the Year of the Estonian Association of Information Technology and Telecommunications
- 1999: Ten Outstanding Young Persons laureate, JCI Estonia.
- 1998: Postimees Person of the Year
