= Elion Enterprises Limited =

Company based in Estonia

Telia Enterprises Limited
- Company type: Private
- Industry: Telecommunications
- Predecessor: Eesti Telefon
- Founded: 1993 as Eesti Telefon; 2003 as Elion Enterprises Limited/Elion
- Defunct: 2016
- Headquarters: Tallinn, Estonia
- Products: Telecommunication services Devices
- Revenue: EUR 191 million (2007)
- Owner: TeliaSonera AB
- Number of employees: 1,533 (2007)
- Website: www.elion.ee

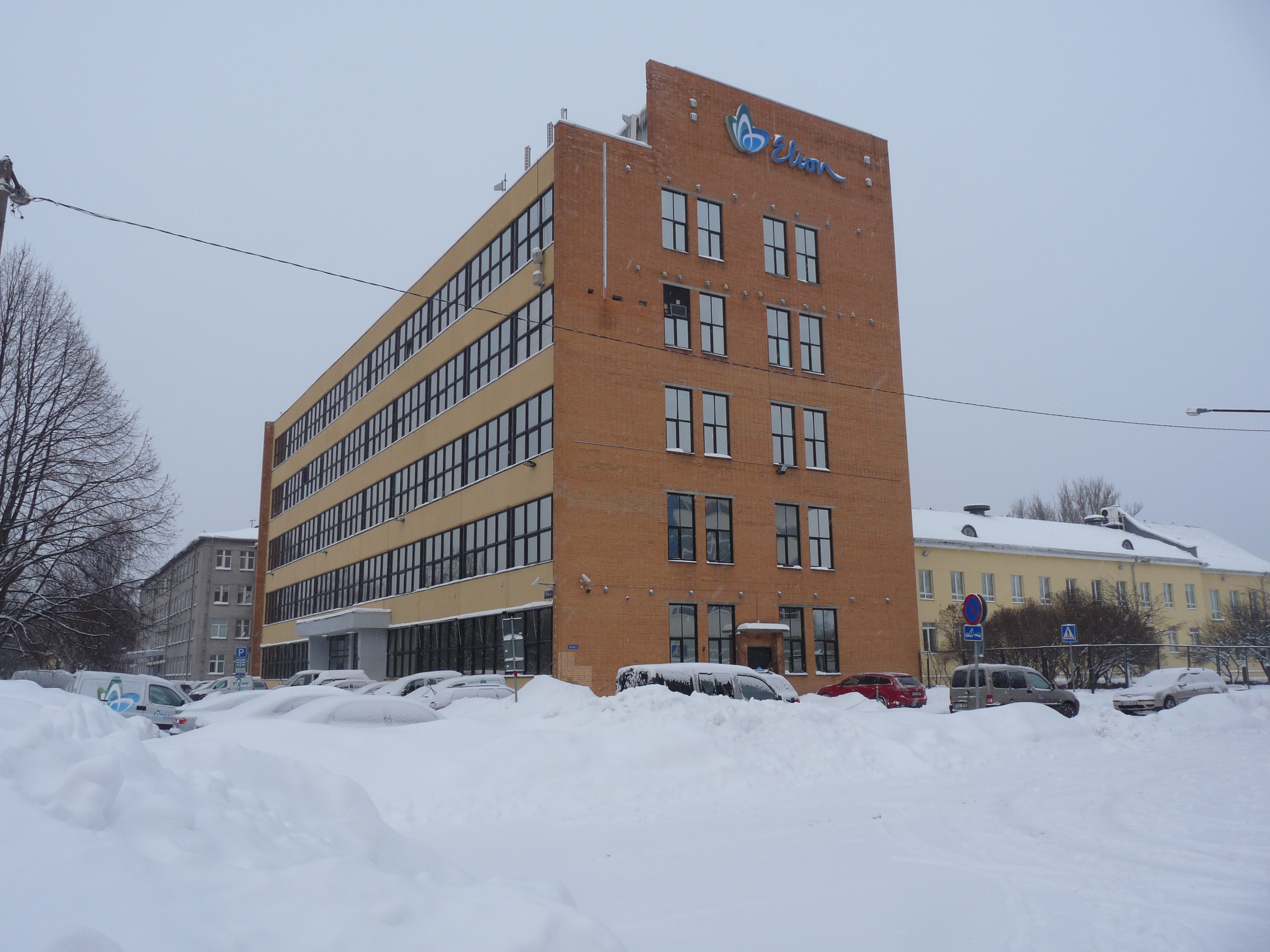
Elion offices in Tallinn

Elion Enterprises Limited, or Elion for short, was the largest telecommunications and Internet service provider in Estonia. It was owned by Eesti Telekom (now Telia Eesti), which until September 2009 was listed at the stock exchanges of Tallinn (ETLAT) and London (EETD), and was bought by the TeliaSonera group.

The Elion Group's consolidated revenues for 2007 were 2.98 billion kroons (191 million euros), making it one of the largest companies in Estonia. It had 1,533 employees at the end of 2007.

On 12 May 2011, Elion, like all other TeliaSonera group companies, changed its logo. The logo change reportedly cost Elion and EMT 700,000 euros.

In 2011, the logos of TeliaSonera's subsidiaries have smoothed up, which is why Elion and EMT have the same logo and visual identity with the entire TeliaSonera group. On 20 January 2016, the company, along with mobile services provider EMT were merged under the Telia name, along with parent company Eesti Telekom becoming Telia Eesti.
