= Hannes Astok =

Estonian politician

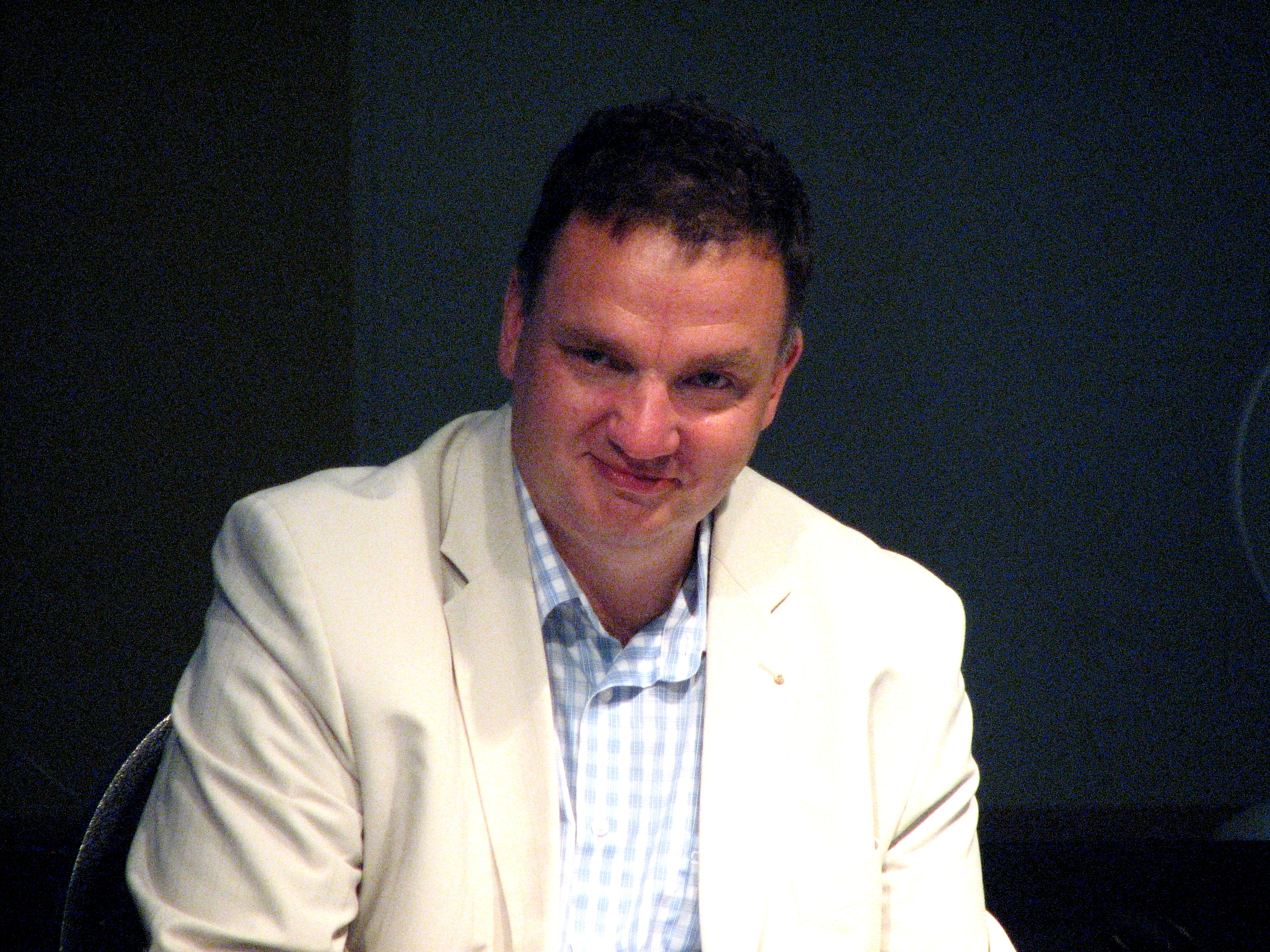
Hannes Astok in 2013

Hannes Astok (born 25 September 1964 in Tallinn) is an Estonian journalist, radio presenter and politician. He has been member of XI Riigikogu.

Astok was the Deputy Mayor of Tartu from 1997 until 2005. He is a member of Estonian Reform Party.
