= Relative Insight =

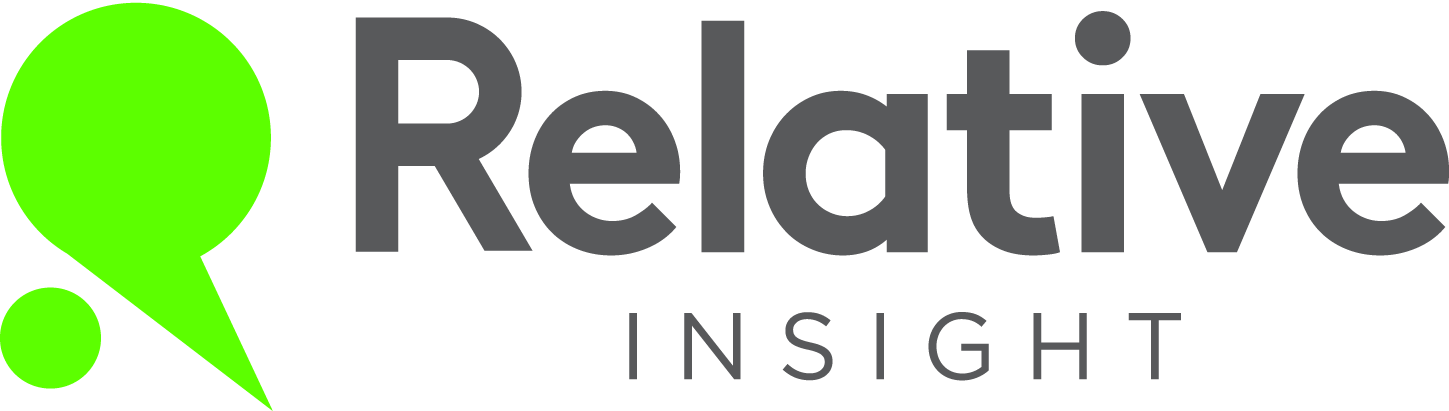
- Company type: Private
- Industry: Data analytics, consumer market research
- Founded: 2012
- Founder: Phil Greenwood, James Walkerdine
- Headquarters: Lancaster, United Kingdom
- Area served: Global
- Key people: Ben Hookway (CEO), Phil Greenwood (CTO), James Walkerdine (COO), James Cuthbertson (CRO)
- Website: https://relativeinsight.com

Relative Insight is a British technology and data analytics company founded in 2012, with offices in Lancaster and London. The company originated from a research project at Lancaster University, initially developed for crime detection and linguistic analysis in law enforcement.

Relative Insight uses comparative language analytics to identify statistically significant differences in how different groups of people communicate. The platform compares language sets to uncover variations in words, grammar, topics, and tone. This enables organizations to understand consumer attitudes, improve messaging strategies, and track linguistic trends over time.

== History ==
Relative Insight was spun out of Lancaster University in 2012 by founders Phil Greenwood and James Walkerdine, and was later joined by Ben Hookway and Rich Wilson in 2013.

== Technology and Products ==
The company's core technology originated from a decade-long research project conducted by the university's linguistics and cyber security departments. The research was initially aimed at identifying individuals engaged in online criminal activity by detecting discrepancies in their language patterns. The first commercial application of the technology was in law enforcement. Relative Insight has since expanded its application of the same linguistic comparison technology to the marketing and consumer analytics sectors.

== Use Cases ==
Clients include global brands and agencies such as Disney, Unilever, R/GA, Havas, and Pearson.

== Funding and Growth ==
The company has gone through multiple funding rounds, including £4m Series A funding from Maven Capital Partners and multiple funding rounds from YFM Equity Partners, including £5m Series B funding.
