= EMT (mobile operator) =

Company based in Estonia

AS EMT
- Company type: Public
- Industry: Telecommunications
- Founded: 1991
- Defunct: 2016
- Headquarters: Valge 16; 19095 Tallinn; Estonia
- Key people: Valdo Kalm (CEO); Leho Tamm (CFO); Indrek Randveer (Executive VP Customer Care and Sales); Tõnu Grünberg (Executive VP Development and Technology); Piret Dubout (Executive VP Marketing); Tiit Tammiste (Executive VP IT)
- Products: Mobile network operator
- Website: www.emt.ee

AS EMT was Estonia's and one of the Baltic's largest mobile operator. Founded on 28 April 1991 as an Estonian under Eesti Telekom (now Telia Eesti).

On 20 January 2016, the company, along with telecommunications provider Elion were merged under the Telia name, along with parent company Eesti Telekom becoming Telia Eesti.

The company is headquartered in Tallinn. Traded on NASDAQ OMX stock exchanges.

AS EMT began operations on April 28, 1991, when a joint venture was formed by Eesti Telekom (51%), Sweden's Telia (24.5%) and Finland's Sonera (24.5%). On September 1, 2014, the company was merged with its parent company Eesti Telekom, which continued to use the EMT brand when offering mobile communication services. On January 20, 2016, Eesti Telekom changed its business name to Telia Eesti AS and merged the existing brands Elion and EMT into one Telia.

== See also ==
- List of mobile network operators in Europe
