= X-Road =

Centrally managed distributed Data Exchange Layer (DXL) between information systems

- Developer: Nordic Institute for Interoperability Solutions
- Written in: Java
- License: MIT License
- Website: x-road.global
- Repository: github.com/nordic-institute/X-Road

X-Road is a centrally managed distributed Data Exchange Layer (DXL) between information systems. Organizations can exchange information over the Internet using X-Road to ensure confidentiality, integrity and interoperability between data exchange parties.

The first X-Road iteration was developed and launched by Estonia's Information System Authority (RIA) in 2001. The source code of its central components were released on October 3, 2016 under an MIT License. By February 7, 2018, Finland's and Estonia's data exchange layers were connected to one another. In 2017, Finland and Estonia established the Nordic Institute for Interoperability Solutions (NIIS) to continue the development of the X-Road core.

== Features ==
According to their web page, "The X-Road is an open source data exchange layer solution that enables organizations to exchange information over the Internet. The X-Road is a centrally managed distributed integration layer between Information Systems that provides a standardized and secure way to produce and consume services. The X-Road ensures confidentiality, integrity and interoperability between data exchange parties."

A unique differentiator of X-Road compared to other governmental API exchange platforms, is the institution of decentralized peer-to-peer communication for API transactions. In this structure, organizations maintain and provide service endpoints for various transactions. These peer-to-peer transactions occur over the general internet and secure data exchange is enforced using Public Key Infrastructure concepts. Each peer who wishes to exchange data holds a unique set of key pairs for both digital signatures and authentication.

== History ==
X-Road was started in 1998 as a pilot project under the Ministry of Economy and Communications, and the first prototype was publicly presented in 2000. One of the main reasons behind architectural choice of distributed data storage was a massive data leak of 1996, where government contractor and computer specialist Imre Perli created and marketed a "superdatabase" containing personal data from various government sources.

The Information System Authority (RIA) at the Ministry of Economy and Communications, developed X-Road and launched the first version in 2001 and holds the registered trademark, X-Road.

On October 3, 2016, the source code of central components of X-Road was released under an MIT License.

February 7, 2018, Finland's and Estonia's data exchange layers were connected to one another. X-Road is used nationwide in the Estonian public administration (X-tee) and in the Suomi.fi Data Exchange Layer (Suomi.fi-palveluväylä) service. X-Road has built-in support for connecting two X-Road ecosystems with each other which enables a native cross-border data exchange between Estonia and Finland.

== Nordic Institute for Interoperability Solutions (NIIS) ==
The Nordic Institute for Interoperability Solutions (NIIS) was founded jointly in June 2017 by Finland and Estonia, with a mission "to develop e-governance solutions...with the X-Road technology used nationwide in the Estonian X-tee and in the Finnish Suomi.fi Data Exchange Layer services".

The NIIS manages, develops, verifies, and audits X-Road's source code; administers documentation, business and technical requirements; conducts development; develops and implements principles of licensing and distribution; provides second-line support for members, and engages in international cooperation.

== X-Road and blockchain ==
By April 2018, a number of articles erroneously stated that X-Road is a "blockchain-based technology or it utilizes blockchain internally". According to an April 18, 2018 article by Petteri Kivimäki the CTO of the Nordic Institute for Interoperability Solutions (NIIS), "There is no blockchain technology in the X-Road." Kivimäki "was the technical lead of X-Road implementation project in Finland and was coordinating the joint open source development of the X-Road solution between Finland and Estonia." Still, there are still contested claims around the use of blockchain in combination with X-Road.

== See also ==
- E-Estonia
- Once-only principle
