= Estonian Association of Information Technology and Telecommunications =

Organization based in Estonia

Estonian Association of Information Technology and Telecommunications (Estonian: Eesti Infotehnoloogia ja Telekommunikatsiooni Liit, abbreviated ITL) is an Estonian organisation which unites technology and telecommunications companies and organisations in Estonia, enhances their co-operation. Co-operation provides Estonia development towards information society.

ITL is a member of DigitalEurope, Estonian Chamber of Commerce and Industry, Estonian Employers' Confederation and Estonian Taxpayers Association.

ITL predecessor was Estonian Computer Association (AFA), which was founded in 1992. On 23 March 2000, AFA joined with Association of Telecommunication Companies (TEL). After merging of AFA and TEL, the ITL was established.
