= 1M1B =

1M1B (One Million for One Billion) is a United Nations-accredited nonprofit organization established in 2014, founded by Manav Subodh. The organization focuses on digital skilling, change-making, and entrepreneurship, aiming to equip youth throughout India with essential skills such as artificial Intelligence (AI), Green Skills, Entrepreneurship, Digital Citizenship, Augmented Reality (AR), Virtual Reality (VR), and other emerging technologies.

1M1B works closely with the UN Economic and Social Council (UN-ECOSOC) and the United Nations Department of Global Communications and has launched India's First Artificial Intelligence (AI) Youth Lab in New Delhi, geared towards accelerating Sustainable Development Goals. The organisation is present in about 500 schools and 100 universities in India, and has reached over 500,000 students through its various programmes.

In partnership with IBM SkillsBuild, the organisation developed an AI elective curriculum now offered to Class 11 and 12 students in CBSE schools, aligned with the National Education Policy 2020. The intent was to bring structured AI learning into the formal school system, rather than leaving it to isolated initiatives or private institutions.

At the state level, the organisation is one of the partners of a programme called AI Pragya run by the government of Uttar Pradesh, working within government school systems to reach students who fall outside the first wave of technology access.

For post-school learners, 1M1B launched YuvAI in November 2024, a programme that introduces students to open-source models and practical AI workflows. Since its launch, the initiative has trained 15,000 students and 300 faculty members, supported the creation of 200 AI innovation use cases, and helped five AI startups with growth targets. In partnership with Microsoft and the MeitY Startup Hub, the organisation is running Green Skills and Applied AI Centre of Excellence- an attempt to link AI capability to climate-connected work and rural livelihoods.

== Initiatives ==
=== The Digital Nagrik Campaign ===
The Digital Nagrik campaign, supported by Meta, aims to create awareness about women's safety online and foster a culture of digital safety. Launched on Safer Internet Day, the campaign has witnessed huge support from women and girls across India, with women and girls taking more than 60% of the 15,000 pledges so far. The Digital Nagrik campaign aligns with the central government's objective to ensure an open, safe, trusted, and accountable internet for its citizens. Over 3.5 lakh teachers and 12 lakh students from 3000+ schools have participated in Digital Citizenship curriculum training programs.

=== Future Leaders Programme ===
The Future Leaders program is a comprehensive leadership development initiative that aims to create a new generation of socially conscious leaders who can tackle societal issues in a sustainable manner. As a part of this program, 14 students from Bengaluru were shortlisted to present their impact projects at the UN Headquarters in New York. 14-year-old Divaa Uthkarsha, who won the Diana Award in 2023 for her humanitarian project, Project Surya, was mentored by 1M1B through the Future Leaders programme.

=== The Digital Nagrik Campaign ===
The Digital Nagrik campaign, supported by Meta, aims to create awareness about women's safety online and foster a culture of digital safety. Launched on Safer Internet Day, the campaign has witnessed huge support from women and girls across India, with women and girls taking more than 60% of the 15,000 pledges so far. The Digital Nagrik campaign aligns with the central government's objective to ensure an open, safe, trusted, and accountable internet for its citizens. Over 3.5 lakh teachers and 12 lakh students from 3000+ schools have participated in Digital Citizenship curriculum training programs.

=== Green Skills Academy ===
In February 2024, 1M1B signed an MoU with Govt. of Meghalaya to set up India's second Green Skills Academy. The 1M1B Foundation, in collaboration with IT firm Salesforce and the support of the Telangana government, is set to establish a Green Skills Academy in Hyderabad. The academy aims to train one million youth from Telangana by 2030.
