= Datafication =

Technological trend

Datafication is a technological trend turning many aspects of our life into data, which is then converted into information, thereby manifesting as a new form of value. This concept was introduced to the broader lexicon in 2013 by Kenneth Cukier and Viktor Mayer-Schönberger. Prior to this, datafication had been predominantly associated with the analysis of representations of our lives captured through data, but not on the present scale. This transformation can be attributed to the impact of big data and the computational opportunities afforded to predictive analytics.

Datafication is not the same as digitization, which takes analog content—books, films, photographs—and converts it into digital information, a sequence of ones and zeros that computers can read. Datafication is a far broader activity: taking all aspects of life and turning them into data [...] Once we datafy things, we can transform their purpose and turn the information into new forms of value

== Ideology ==
Datafication has an ideological aspect, called dataism:

"The drive towards datafication is rooted in a belief in the capacity of data to represent social life, sometimes better or more objectively than pre-digital (human) interpretations."

== Examples ==
Datafication is often applied to social and communication media. Some examples include how Twitter datafies stray thoughts, as well as datafication of HR by LinkedIn and others.

Other examples include aspects of the build environment, and design via engineering and or other tools that tie data to formal, functional, or other physical media outcomes. Data collection and processing for optimal control (e.g., shape optimization) is another example.

== Impact ==
Health care

The datafication of health occurs at various levels and in different areas, including:

- Data-driven medical research and public health infrastructures, such as biobanks and government databases;
- Clinical healthcare, including continuous patient monitoring, implantable biosensors, internet-based doctor-patient communication and personalised or 'precision' medicine, collectively described as digital health, eHealth, mHealth, or Health 2.0;
- Self-care practices, including direct-to-consumer genetic and microbiome testing websites, health-related peer-to-peer social media and a wide range of wearable fitness and health devices and smartphone apps.

Human resources
Data obtained from mobile phones, apps or social media usage is used to identify potential employees and their specific characteristics such as risk taking profile and personality. This data will replace personality tests. Rather using the traditional personality tests or the exams that measure the analytical thinking, using the data obtained through datafication will change existing exam providers. Also, with this data new personality measures will be developed.
Insurance and Banking
Data is used to understand an individual's risk profile and likelihood to pay a loan.
Customer relationship management
Various industries are using datafication to understand their customers better and create appropriate triggers based on each customer's personality and behaviour. This data is obtained from the language and tone a person uses in emails, phone calls or social medias.
Data security
Scammers seek out sensitive information like bank info, social security, or other important credentials to sell.

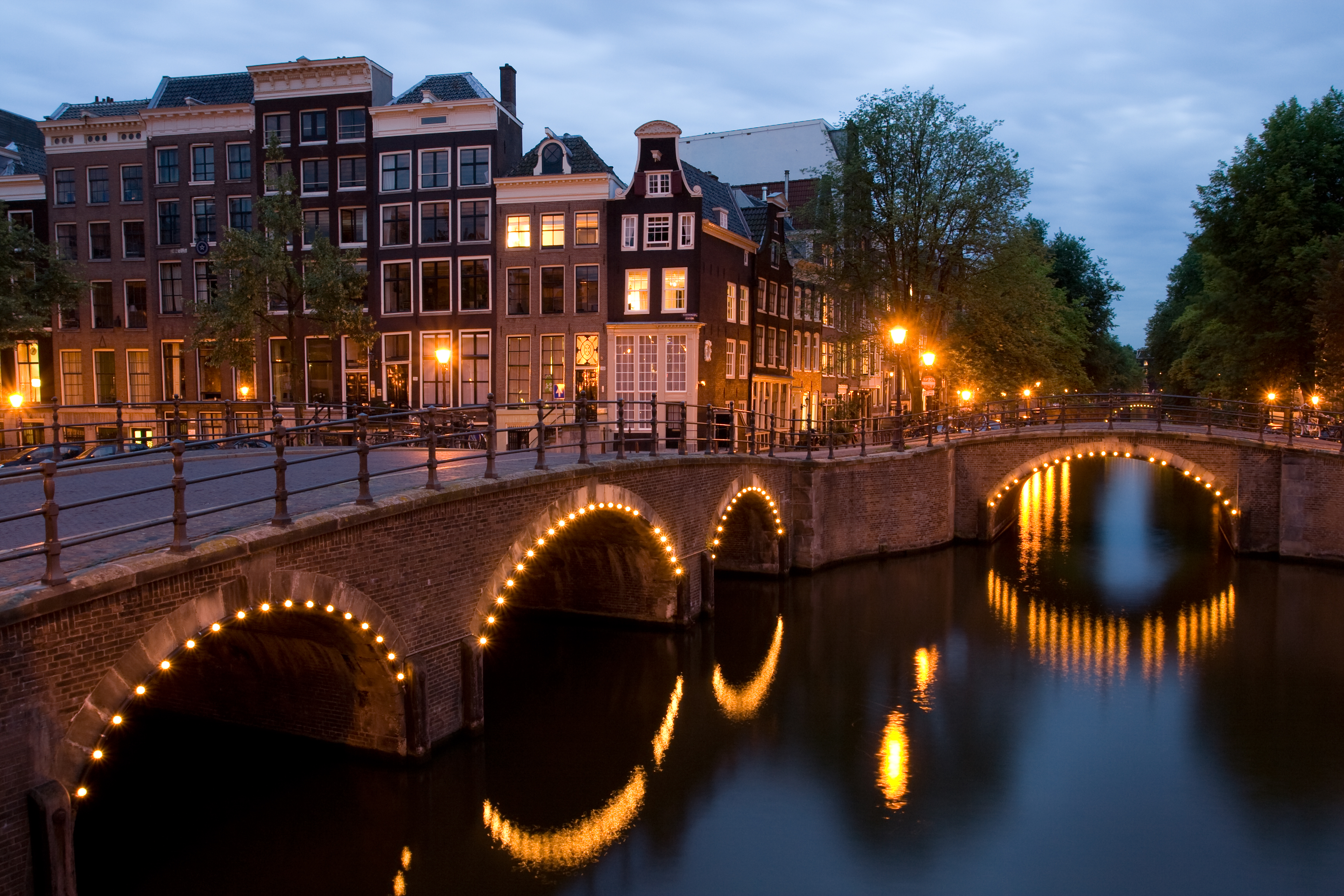
Street lamps in Amsterdam have been upgraded to allow municipal councils to dim the lights based on pedestrian usage.

Smart city
Through the data obtained from the sensors that are implemented into the smart city, issues that can arise might be noticed and tackled in areas such as transportation, waste management, logistics, and energy. On the basis of real-time data, commuters could change their routes when there is a traffic jam. With the sensors that can measure air and water quality, cities can not only gain a more detailed understanding of the pollution levels, but may also enact new environmental regulations based on real-time data. However, this digital hyperconnectivity, algorithmization and datafication of urban society raise profound ethical issues that redefine the very concept of citizenship and public space.

== See also ==
- Digital citizen
- Data mining
- Data science
- Digitization/ Digitalization
- Digital transformation
- Big data
- Ethics of artificial intelligence
- Big data ethics
- Machine learning
- Mass surveillance
- Real-time data
- Surveillance capitalism
