= Informational self-determination =

German right of personal info disclosure

The term informational self-determination was first used in the context of a German constitutional ruling relating to personal information collected during the 1983 census. The German term is informationelle Selbstbestimmung. It is formally defined as "the authority of the individual to decide himself, on the basis of the idea of self-determination, when and within what limits information about his private life should be communicated to others." Freedom of speech, protection of privacy, right to active private life, right to education, protection of personal data, and the right to public sector information all fall under the umbrella of informational self-determination.

On that occasion, the German Federal Constitutional Court ruled that: “[...] in the context of modern data processing, the protection of the individual against unlimited collection, storage, use and disclosure of his/her personal data is encompassed by the general personal rights of the German constitution. This basic right warrants in this respect the capacity of the individual to determine in principle the disclosure and use of his/her personal data. Limitations to this informational self-determination are allowed only in case of overriding public interest.”

Informational self-determination is often considered similar to the right to privacy but has unique characteristics that distinguish it from the "right to privacy" in the United States tradition. Informational self-determination reflects Westin's description of privacy: “The right of the individual to decide what information about himself should be communicated to others and under what circumstances” (Westin, 1970). In contrast, the "right to privacy" in the United States legal tradition is commonly considered to originate in Warren and Brandeis' article, which focuses on the right to "solitude" (i.e., being "left alone") and in the Constitution's Fourth Amendment, which protects persons and their belongings from warrantless search.

== Germany ==
The German Federal Constitutional Court Population Census Decision comprises a foundation in the improvement of federal data protection laws and is even alluded to as "the very key to the German view on data protection". In this decision, the Court invented the right to informational self-determination as a new constitutional right, which can be viewed as the constitutional basis for the right to be forgotten. The right to be forgotten can be viewed as a component of the right to informational self-determination. As this privilege just produces coordinate results when an official authority is involved, the different inquiries concerning private parties and their claims to delete data in the hands of different privates remain unanswered. Furthermore, there is no explicit definition of a right to be forgotten because it is nearly impossible for something on the internet to be forgotten. Neither the legislator nor the high courts use the term of a right to be forgotten the way, for instance, the new Draft Data Protection Regulation does. This makes it difficult to give a definite answer to the response to the subject of whether such a privilege can be found in German law.

== Privacy notices ==
Privacy notices are instruments that are used to educate people of the handling of their own personal data, their rights as data subjects, and provide any other information required by data protection or privacy laws. Contrary to popular belief, European Union data protection laws do not require organizations to display a privacy notice on their websites. Although, such notices seem to be logical by-products of data protection and privacy laws, which requires that people are sufficiently informed about the processing of their personal data, these notices are not legally required.

== American perspective ==
In the United States, there is regularly a more prominent accentuation on the liberty of speech and the freedom of press, than the right to informational self-determination.

== See also ==
- Data sovereignty
- Digital citizenship
- Digital identity
- Digital integrity
- Digital self-determination
