= Self representation =

Self representation may refer to:

- Self-image
- Self-portrait
- Pro se legal representation in the United States
- Litigant in person, self-representation in a court in the UK
- Self-representation (politics), a movement to encourage people in minorities to represent their own interests
- Self-representation (culture), the way we represent ourselves to others within a particular culture
- Digital self-determination
