= Digital integrity =

The right to respect for digital integrity is an emerging right to protect people's digital lives.

== Principle ==
Every person (natural or legal) has the right to respect for their physical and moral integrity. The digital revolution has given rise to the notion of digital life. "If human beings have a digital existence, there is reason to consider that their integrity also extends to this dimension"

== The right to digital integrity in different countries ==
=== Costa Rica ===
A conference was organised in 2023 in the Costa Rican Legislative Assembly on the theme of artificial intelligence and participatory democracy, which also presented the evolution of the right to digital integrity.

=== France ===
In a speech on 15 June 2017, the President of the French Republic, Emmanuel Macron, referred to the notion of digital integrity in the security context of the digital society: "Cybercrime, cyberattacks and cyber-criminality are the main threats to digital integrity, and France must aim for excellence in this area by protecting personal data and digital integrity".

On 7 February 2018, a member of the French parliament proposed an amendment to give data a patrimonial and moral value, so that each person each person has authority over his or her digital integrity but which is not accepted.

==== City of Strasbourg ====
On 9 December 2024, the City Council of Strasbourg unanimously adopted a motion presented by the Group Strasbourg écologique et citoyenne for the "right to digital integrity of the individual in its main principles in order to guarantee equal and quality access to public services online and offline "

=== Germany ===
On 29 May 2021, the Pirate Party Germany included the right to digital integrity in its political programme during the German federal elections. The Pirate Party proposes amending Article 2(2) of the Basic Law of the Federal Republic of Germany. The proposed text is "Everyone has the right to life and to physical and digital integrity. Personal freedom is inviolable. These rights may only be infringed by law".

=== Switzerland ===
==== Politics ====
The concept of digital integrity has been defended by the Swiss Pirate Party, which regularly denounces attacks on it. The Social Democratic Party has included the notion of digital integrity in its Internet Policy: "The party is committed to the recognition and protection of citizens' digital integrity. Guaranteeing digital integrity is the main lever for the right to informational self-determination".

==== In law ====
===== Federal level =====
A draft popular initiative aims to add the right to digital integrity to Article 10 of the Swiss Federal Constitution. The draft popular initiative "For Digital Sovereignty" aims to amend the Federal Constitution of the Swiss Confederation to integrity and digital sovereignty.

A parliamentary initiative to introduce the right to digital integrity into the Federal Constitution was submitted on 29 September 2022 by Samuel Bendahan. In December 2023, the National Council rejected the proposal by 118 votes to 65. The majority which had examined the text beforehand, considered that this addition would have an essentially symbolic impact.

===== Cantonal level =====
====== Canton of Basel City ======
In November 2024, several members of the Grand Council of Basel-Stadt have filed a motion requesting to add the right to digital integrity, including the right to an offline life, in the cantonal constitution.

====== Canton of Geneva ======
In September 2020, the Geneva section of the Liberals launched a cantonal popular initiative in the canton of Geneva to include a paragraph in the Geneva constitution stipulating that "everyone has the right to safeguard their digital integrity". In November 2020, the initiative was abandoned in favour of a constitutional law. The draft constitutional law was tabled on 28 April 2021 and provides for the addition of a new paragraph identical to the draft initiative. On 22 September 2022, the Geneva Grand Council passed the constitutional law. Finally a popular vote was accepted by more than 94% of the population on 18 June 2023 to add this new right to the constitution of the canton.

The new constitutional article, art. 21A, also includes additional guarantees for the processing of personal data within the responsibility of the canton and includes the canton's commitment to address the digital divide through promoting digital inclusion, raising public digital awareness, as well as an engagement in the development and implementation of Swiss digital sovereignty.

Map of adoption of the right to digital integrity by Swiss cantons in July 2024

====== Canton of Jura ======
A parliamentary initiative entitled "Guaranteeing digital integrity for everyone" was submitted on 28 September 2022 by Quentin Haas, a member of the Jura parliament. This was accepted on 15 February 2023.

====== Canton of Lucerne ======
In June 2025, several members of the Cantonal Council of Lucerne have filed a motion requesting to add the right to digital integrity, including the right to an offline life, in the cantonal constitution.

====== Canton of Neuchâtel ======
A draft decree amending the Constitution of the Republic and Canton of Neuchâtel was submitted to the Grand Council of Neuchâtel in January 2023. It was accepted by the Grand Council. The change was submitted to a popular vote on 24 November 2024. The e introduction of digital integrity into the constitution was accepted by 91.51% of the voters.

====== Canton of Valais ======
Commission of the Constituent Assembly on the fundamental rights of the Canton of Valais is proposing the introduction of a paragraph in the future Constitution stating that "Every human being has the right to digital integrity". Put to the popular vote in March 2024, the revision of the Constitution was rejected.

====== Canton of Vaud ======
An initiative tabled in January 2023 by around forty members of parliament proposes adding Article 15a Protection of digital integrity in the Vaud constitution.

====== Canton of Zug ======
A petition submitted in June 2023 to the parliament by the local political party Pirat proposes adding the right to digital integrity in a new Article 8 bis in the Zug constitution.

Canton of Zürich

In March 2024, the local political Pirate Party launched a signature campaign for a popular initiative to introduce digital integrity into its cantonal constitution. On August 21, 2024, the initiative was submitted to the Canton of Zurich with 9,841 signatures (6,000 signatures would have been required for it to be valid). The initiative “For a fundamental right to digital integrity” will be put to a vote on November 30, 2025.

== Bibliography ==
- Roussel, Alexis; Barbey, Grégoire; Favier, Jacques (2021). Notre si précieuse intégrité numérique: plaidoyer pour une révolution humaniste. Genève: Editions Slatkine. ISBN 978-2-8321-1052-2.
- Guillaume, Florence; Mahon, Pascal, eds. (2021). Le droit à l'intégrité numérique. Bále: Helbing & Lichtenhahn. ISBN 978-3-7190-4456-5.
- Vardanyan, Lusine; Stehlík, Václav; Kocharyan, Hovsep (2022-05-01). "Digital Integrity: A Foundation for Digital Rights and the New Manifestation of Human Dignity". TalTech Journal of European Studies. 12 (1): 159–185. doi:10.2478/bjes-2022-0008. ISSN 2674-4619. S2CID 249960456.

== See also ==
- Digital citizen
- Digital rights
- Digital self-determination
- Digital assets
- E-government
- Informational self-determination
- Integrity
- Human Rights
- Human Rights in Switzerland
