= Manav Subodh =

Indian social entrepreneur

- Born: India
- Occupation: Social Entrepreneur
- Organization: 1M1B

Manav Subodh is an Indian social entrepreneur. He is the founder of 1M1B, a United Nations-accredited nonprofit organization. He is also one of the creators of 'Big on Small Talk' podcast.

Manav is the curator of 1.5 Matters, which is an initiative to turn India's youth dividend into a climate dividend. 1.5 Matters is an initiative to help shape international opinion, influence policy debates, and build a new generation of leaders who can act, innovate, and advocate for keeping global warming below 1.5°C.

== Career ==
Manav is known for his extensive experience in entrepreneurship and innovation. He has worked at Intel Corporation, where he directed the company's entrepreneurship initiatives in over 30 countries. His career also includes roles at Ernst & Young (EY), Hughes, and QAI. Between 2015 and 2017, he served as a Senior Fellow at the Haas School of Business at University of California, Berkeley and, in 2016, as the Garwood Innovation Fellow with UC Berkeley's Corporate and Open Innovation Center, where he led the Smart Village initiative in India. Manav was the Global Entrepreneurship and Innovation Director at Intel Corporation and served as a member of the National Advisory on Innovation, Incubation, and Technology Entrepreneurship of the Government of India for over five years. Additionally, he was a senior advisor to Ernst & Young (EY) on policy formation for innovation and entrepreneurship for the State Government of Chhattisgarh.

In 2014, Manav founded 1M1B, a nonprofit organization accredited by the United Nations. In 2024, he established India's first Green Skills Academy in collaboration with the State Governments of Telangana and Meghalaya, as well as the Government of India, with the goal of engaging 10 million youth in climate action. Manav is also a co-creator of "The Big Small Talk" podcast, developed with Anuj Sawhney.
