= Frenchelon =

French signals intelligence system

Coordinates: 44°47′11″N 1°14′17″E

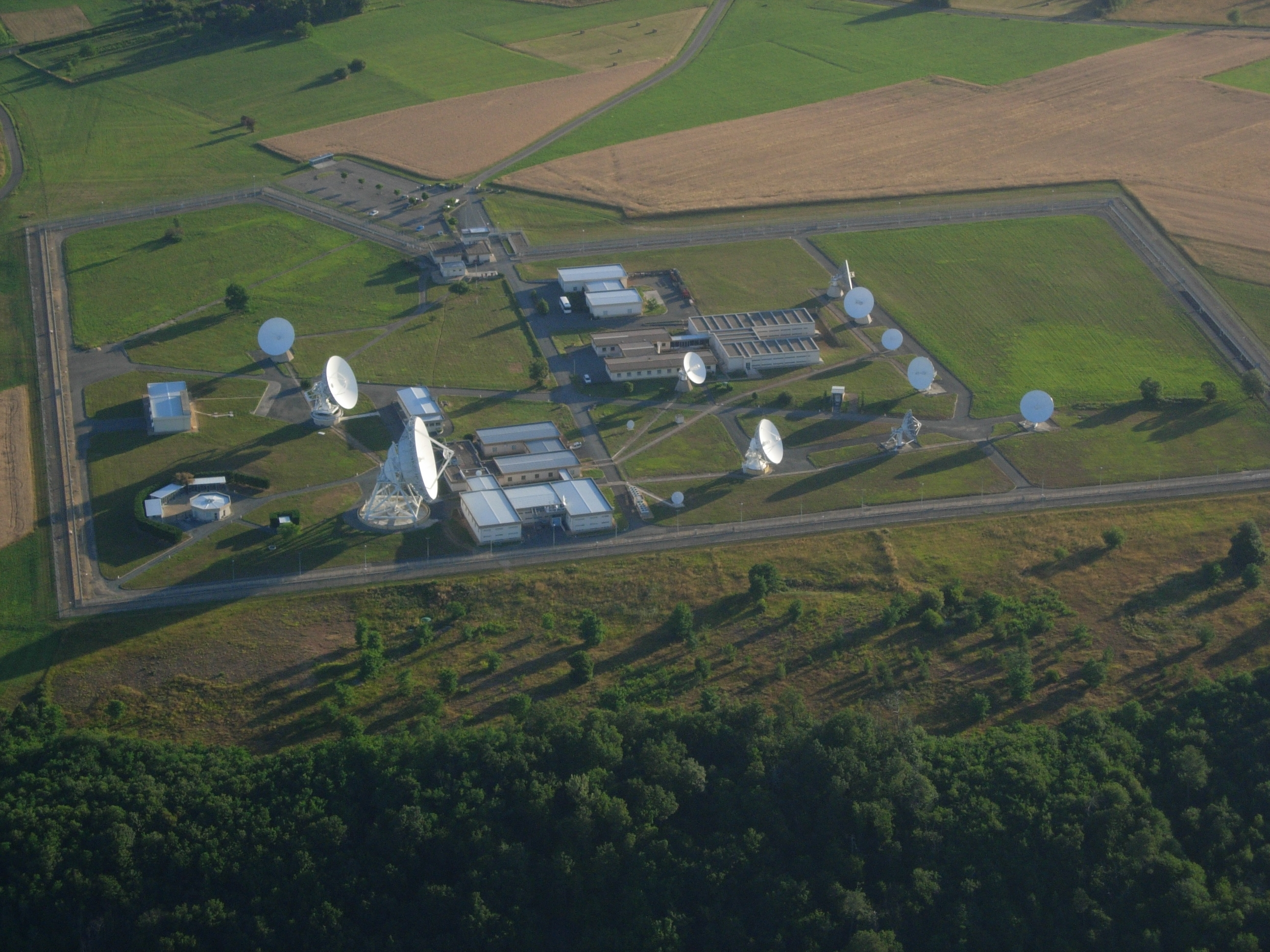
A DGSE site in Domme, Périgord

"Frenchelon" is the nickname given to the signal intelligence system operated by France. The name is a reference to its Anglo-American counterpart ECHELON.

== History ==
Its existence has never been officially acknowledged by French authorities, although numerous journalists, based on military information, have mentioned it, since the European Parliament investigated ECHELON and also its implications in counter-terrorism. The term was coined by Kenneth Cukier, an American journalist living in Paris, in a paper presented at the Computers, Freedom and Privacy conference in 1999, and later in an op-ed in The Wall Street Journal Europe edition.

== Operations ==
The system is allegedly operated by DGSE, whose Direction Technique (Technical Direction) is responsible for signal intelligence. The largest station is in Domme, near Sarlat in Périgord. Some of the other stations in France are: Alluets-Feucherolles (Alluets-le-Roi), Mutzig (Alsace), Mont Valérien, Plateau d'Albion, Agde, Solenzara (South Corsica), and Filley Barracks in Nice.

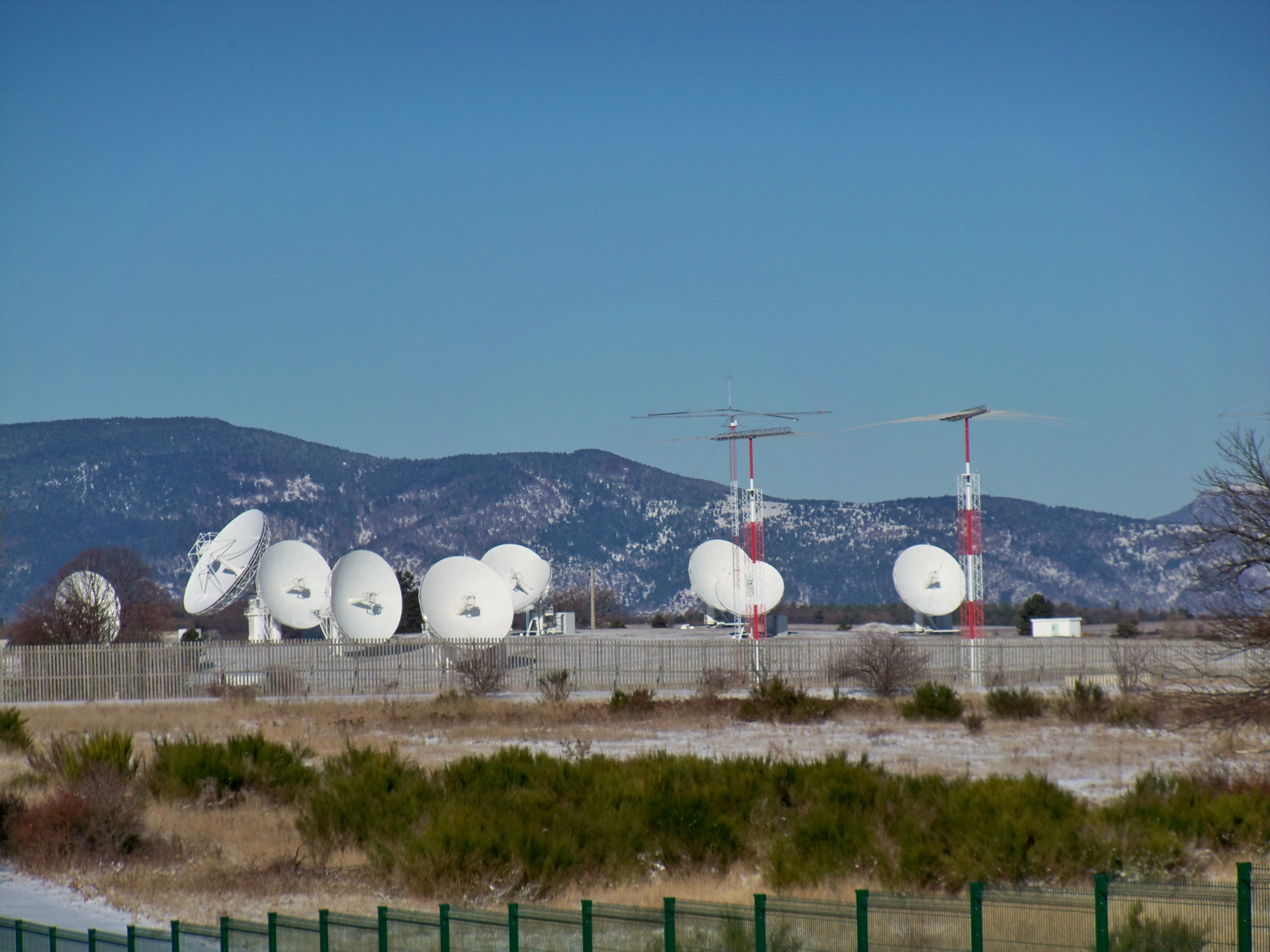
A DGSE site near Saint-Christol, Vaucluse

There are some other stations in overseas territories and former colonies:

- Saint-Barthélemy
- Bouar, Central African Republic
- Djibouti (Camp Lemonnier - closed, now occupied by Combined Joint Task Force – Horn of Africa): new center built recently between French Air Force Base and French Foreign Legion camp in Djibouti.
- Mayotte (Closed in 1998)
- Réunion
- Kourou, French Guiana
- and base aeronavale La Tontouta in New Caledonia

These stations, in addition to the DGSE headquarters on boulevard Mortier in Paris, intercept and decipher electronic communications using software coded communications of diplomatic, military or industrial origin.

French newspapers recently indicated that DGSE had an interception program on submarine cables, similar to NSA ones. No official data indicates whether this could be a part of FRENCHELON.

It should not be confused with the French Army's official listening system Emeraude (Ensemble mobile écoute et recherche automatique des émissions), which used to be mistakenly confused with Frenchelon.

== Map ==
Map of Signals Intelligence installations
Location of signals collection of France
