= Digital citizen =

Person using IT to engage in society, politics, and government

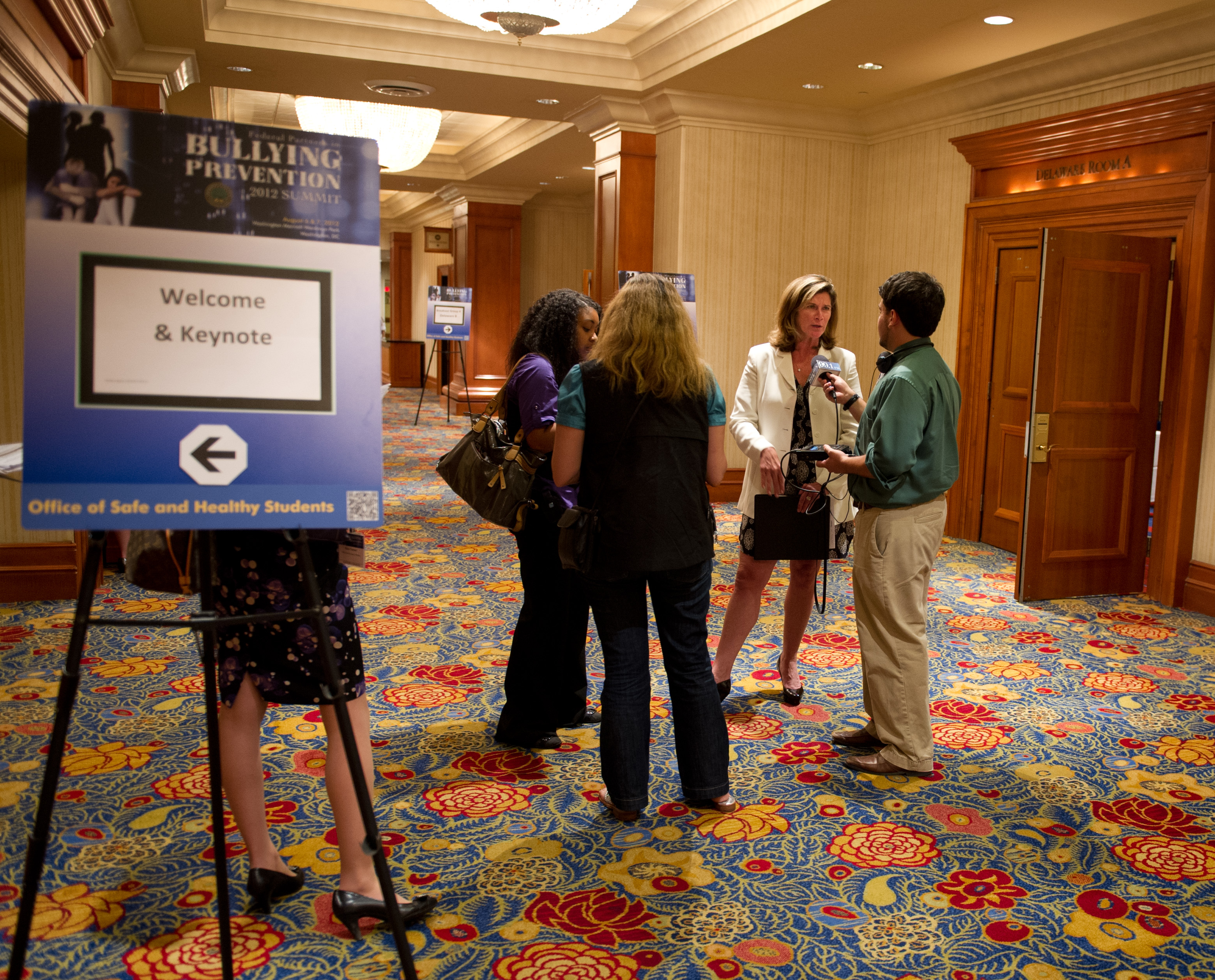
Every year the Federal Partners in Bullying Prevention hosts a summit to highlight its work to prevent cyberbullying, especially in schools and amongst students, in efforts to become responsible digital citizens.

The term digital citizen is used with different meanings. According to the definition provided by Karen Mossberger, one of the authors of Digital Citizenship: The Internet, Society, and Participation, digital citizens are "those who use the internet regularly and effectively". In this sense, a digital citizen is a person who uses information technology (IT) to engage in society, politics, and government.

More recent elaborations of the concept define digital citizenship as the self-enactment of people’s role in society through the use of digital technologies, stressing the empowering and democratizing characteristics of the citizenship idea. These theories aim at taking into account the ever-increasing datafication of contemporary societies (symbolically linked to the Snowden leaks), which has called into question the meaning of “being (digital) citizens in a datafied society”. This condition is also referred to as the “algorithmic society”, characterised by the increasing datafication of social life and the pervasive presence of surveillance practices – see surveillance and surveillance capitalism, the use of artificial intelligence, and Big Data.

Datafication presents crucial challenges for the very notion of citizenship, so that data collection can no longer be seen as an issue of privacy alone so that:

We cannot simply assume that being a citizen online already means something (whether it is the ability to participate or the ability to stay safe) and then look for those whose conduct conforms to this meaning

Instead, the idea of digital citizenship shall reflect the idea that we are no longer mere “users” of technologies since they shape our agency both as individuals and as citizens.

Digital citizenship refers to the responsible and respectful use of technology to engage online, evaluate information, and protect human rights. It encompasses skills for communication, collaboration, empathy, privacy protection, and security to prevent data breaches and identity theft.

== Digital citizenship in the "algorithmic society" ==
In the context of the algorithmic society, the question of digital citizenship "becomes one of the extents to which subjects are able to challenge, avoid or mediate their data double in this datafied society”.

These reflections put the emphasis on the idea of the digital space (or cyberspace) as a political space where the respect of fundamental rights of the individual shall be granted (with reference both to the traditional ones as well as to new specific rights of the internet [see “digital constitutionalism”]) and where the agency and the identity of the individuals as citizens is at stake. This idea of digital citizenship is thought to be not only active but also performative, in the sense that “in societies that are increasingly mediated through digital technologies, digital acts become important means through which citizens create, enact and perform their role in society.”

In particular, for Isin and Ruppert this points towards an active meaning of (digital) citizenship based on the idea that we constitute ourselves as digital citizen by claiming rights on the internet, either by saying or by doing something.

== Types of digital participation ==
People who characterize themselves as digital citizens often use IT extensively—creating blogs, using social networks, and participating in online journalism. Although digital citizenship begins when any child, teen, or adult signs up for an email address, posts pictures online, uses e-commerce to buy merchandise online, and/or participates in any electronic function that is B2B or B2C, the process of becoming a digital citizen goes beyond simple internet activity. According to Thomas Humphrey Marshall, a British sociologist known for his work on social citizenship, a primary framework of citizenship comprises three different traditions: liberalism, republicanism, and ascriptive hierarchy. Within this framework, the digital citizen needs to exist in order to promote equal economic opportunities and increase political participation. In this way, digital technology helps to lower the barriers to entry for participation as a citizen within a society.

They also have a comprehensive understanding of digital citizenship, which is the appropriate and responsible behavior when using technology. Since digital citizenship evaluates the quality of an individual's response to membership in a digital community, it often requires the participation of all community members, both visible and those who are less visible. A large part in being a responsible digital citizen encompasses digital literacy, etiquette, online safety, and an acknowledgement of private versus public information. The development of digital citizen participation can be divided into two main stages.

The first stage is through information dissemination, which includes subcategories of its own:

- static information dissemination, characterized largely by citizens who use read-only websites where they take control of data from credible sources in order to formulate judgments or facts. Many of these websites where credible information may be found are provided by the government.
- dynamic information dissemination, which is more interactive and involves citizens as well as public servants. Both questions and answers can be communicated, and citizens have the opportunity to engage in question-and-answer dialogues through two-way communication platforms

The second stage of digital citizen participation is citizen deliberation, which evaluates what type of participation and role that they play when attempting to ignite some sort of policy change.

- static citizen participants can play a role by engaging in online polls as well as through complaints and recommendations sent up, mainly toward the government who can create changes in policy decisions.
- dynamic citizen participants can deliberate amongst others on their thoughts and recommendations in town hall meetings or various media sites.

One potential advantage of online participation through digital citizenship is increased social inclusion. In a report on civic engagement, citizen-powered democracy can be initiated either through information shared through the web, direct communication signals made by the state toward the public, and social media tactics from both private and public companies. In fact, it was found that the community-based nature of social media platforms allow individuals to feel more socially included and informed about political issues that peers have also been found to engage with, otherwise known as a "second-order effect." Understanding strategic marketing on social media would further explain social media customers’ participation. Two types of opportunities rise as a result, the first being the ability to lower barriers that can make exchanges much easier. In addition, they have the chance to participate in transformative disruption, giving people who have a historically lower political engagement to mobilize in a much easier and convenient fashion.

Nonetheless, there are several challenges that face the presence of digital technologies in political participation. Both current as well as potential challenges can create significant risks for democratic processes. Not only is digital technology still seen as relatively ambiguous, it was also seen to have "less inclusivity in democratic life." Demographic groups differ considerably in the use of technology, and thus, one group could potentially be more represented than another as a result of digital participation. Another primary challenge consists in the ideology of a "filter bubble" effect. Alongside a tremendous spread of false information, internet users could reinforce existing prejudices and assist in polarizing disagreements in the public sphere. This can lead to misinformed voting and decisions based on exposure rather than on pure knowledge. A communication technology director, Van Dijk, stated, "Computerized information campaigns and mass public information systems have to be designed and supported in such a way that they help to narrow the gap between the 'information rich' and 'information poor' otherwise the spontaneous development of ICT will widen it." Access and equivalent amounts of knowledge behind digital technology must be equivalent in order for a fair system to put into place.

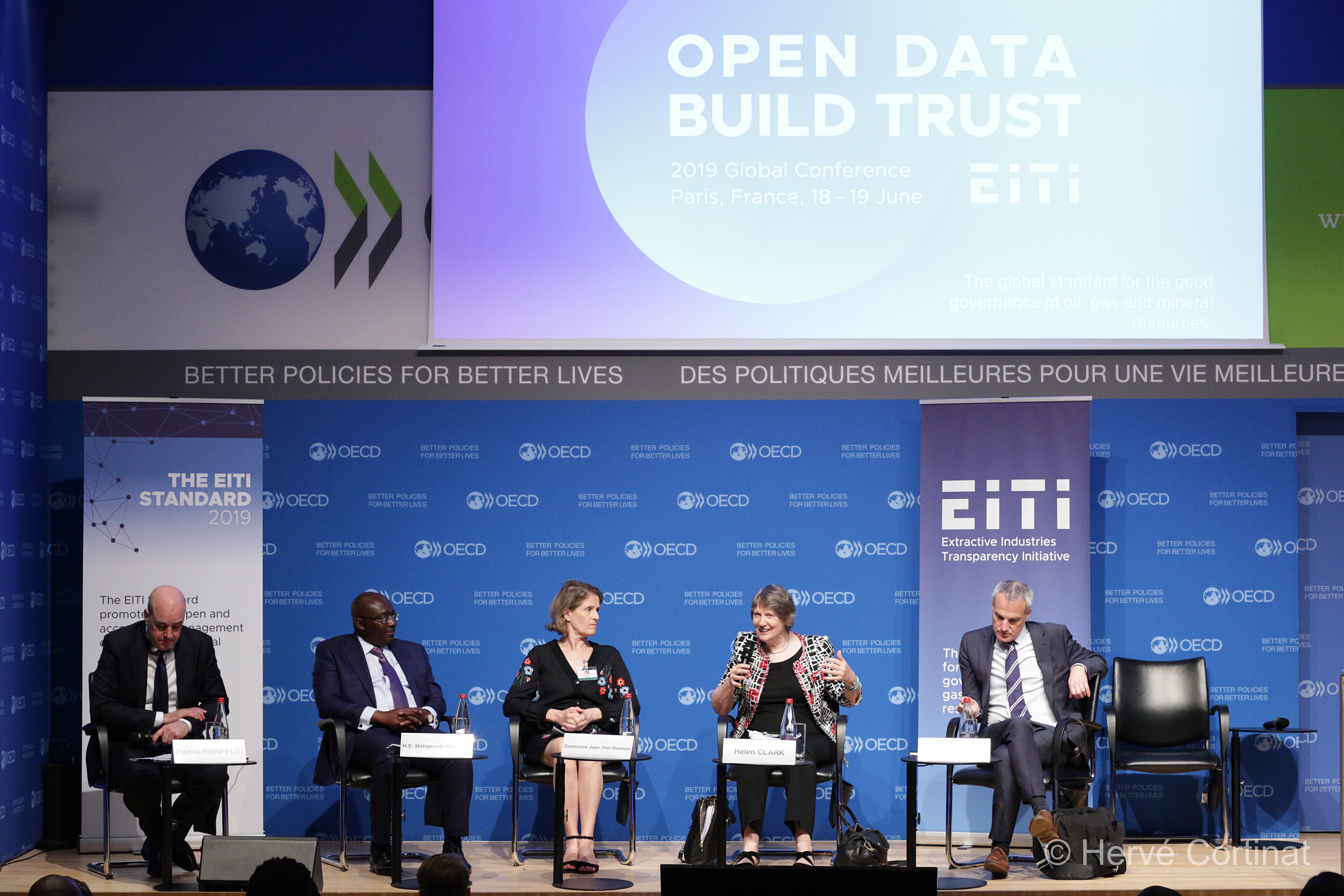
Hosted by the Government of France at the OECD Conference Centre in Paris, representatives discussed trust in data and how we can use data to spread openness in addressing environmental challenges.

Alongside a lack of evidenced support for technology that can be proven to be safe for citizens, the OECD has identified five struggles for the online engagement of citizens:

1. Scale: To what extent can a society allow every individual's voice to be heard, but also not be lost in the mass debate? This can be extremely challenging for the government, which may not effectively know how to listen and respond to each individual contribution.
2. Capacity: How can digital technology offer citizens more information on public policy-making? The opportunity for citizens to debate with one another is lacking for active citizenship.
3. Coherence: The government is yet to design a more holistic view of the policy-making cycle and the use of design technology to better prepare information from citizens in each stage of the policy-making cycle.
4. Evaluation: There is a greater need now than ever before to figure out whether or not the online engagement can help meet the citizen as well as the government's objectives.
5. Commitment: Is the government committed to analyze and use citizen's public input, and how can this process be validated more regularly?

== Digital disparities ==
=== Developed states and developing countries ===
Highly developed states possess the capacity to link their respective governments with digital sites. Such sites function in ways such as publicizing recent legislation, current, and future policy objectives; lending agency toward political candidates; and/or allowing citizens to voice themselves in a political way. Likewise, the emergence of these sites has been linked to increased voting advocacy. Lack of access to technology can be a serious obstacle in becoming a digital citizen, since many elementary procedures such as tax report filing, birth registration, and use of websites to support candidates in political campaigns (e-democracy) have become available solely via the internet. Furthermore, many cultural and commercial entities only publicize information on web pages. Non-digital citizens will not be able to retrieve this information, and this may lead to social isolation or economic stagnation.

The gap between digital citizens and non-digital citizens is often referred as the digital divide. In developing countries, digital citizens are fewer. They consist of the people who use technology to overcome local obstacles including development issues, corruption, and even military conflict. Examples of such citizens include users of Ushahidi during the 2007 disputed Kenyan election and protesters in the Arab Spring movements who used media to document repression of protests. Currently, the digital divide is a subject of academic debate as access to the internet has increased in these developing countries, but the place in which it is accessed (work, home, public library, etc.) has a significant effect on how much access will be used, if even in a manner related to the citizenry. Recent scholarship has correlated the desire to be technologically proficient with greater belief in computer access equity, and thus, digital citizenship (Shelley, et al.).

On the other side of the divide, one example of a highly developed digital technology program in a wealthy state is the e-Residency of Estonia. This form of digital residency allows both citizens and non-citizens of the state to pursue business opportunities in a digital business environment. The application is simple; residents can fill out a form with their passport and photograph alongside the reason for applying. Following a successful application, the "e-residency" will allow them to register a company, sign documents, make online banking declarations, and file medical prescriptions online, though they will be tracked through financial footprints. The project plans to cover over 10 million e-residents by 2025 and as of April 2019, there were over 54,000 participants from over 162 countries that have expressed an interest, contributing millions of dollars to the country's economy and assisting in access to any public service online. Other benefits include hassle-free administration, lower business costs, access to the European Union market, and a broad range of e-services. Though the program is designed for entrepreneurs, Estonia hopes to value transparency and resourcefulness as a cause for other companies to implement similar policies domestically. In 2021, Estonia's neighbor Lithuania launched a similar e-Residency program.

Nonetheless, Estonia's e-Residency system has been subject to criticism. Many have pointed out that tax treaties within their own countries will play a major role in preventing this idea from spreading to more countries. Another risk is politically for governments to sustain "funding and legislative priorities across different coalitions of power." Most importantly, the threat of cyberattacks may disrupt the seemingly optimal idea of having a platform for eIDs, as Estonia suffered its own massive cyberattack in 2007 by Russian hacktivists. Today, the protection of digital services and databases is essential to national security, and many countries are still hesitant to take the next step forward to promote a new system that will change the scale of politics with all its citizens.

=== Other forms of digital divide ===
Within developed countries, the digital divide, other than economic differences, is attributed to educational levels. A study conducted by the United States National Telecommunications and Information Administration determined that the gap in computer usage and internet access widened 7.8% and 25% between those with the most and least educated, and it has been observed that those with college degrees or higher are 10 times more likely to have internet access at work when compared with those with only a high school education.

A digital divide often extends along specific racial lines as well. The difference in computer usage grew by 39.2% between White and Black households and by 42.6% between White and Hispanic households only three years ago. Race can also affect the number of computers at school, and as expected, gaps between racial groups narrow at higher income levels while widening among households at lower economic levels. Racial disparities have been proven to exist irrespective of income, and in a cultural study to determine reasons for the divide other than income, in accordance to the Hispanic community, computers were seen as a luxury, not a need. Participants collectively stated that computer activities isolated individuals and took away valuable time from family activities. In the African-American community, it was observed that they historically have had negative encounters with technological innovations, and with Asian-Americans, education was emphasized, and thus, there was a larger number of people who embraced the rise in technological advances.

An educational divide also takes place as a result of differences in the use of daily technology. In a report analyzed by the ACT Center for Equity in Learning, "85% of respondents reported having access to anywhere from two to five devices at home. The remaining one percent of respondents reported having access to no devices at home." For the 14% of respondents with one device at home, many of them reported the need to share these devices with other household members, facing challenges that are often overlooked. The data all suggest that wealthier families have access to more devices. In addition, out of the respondents that only used one device at home, 24% of them lived in rural areas, and over half reported that this one device was a smartphone; this could make completing schoolwork assignments more difficult. The ACT recommended that underserved students need access to more devices and higher-quality networks, and educators should do their best to ensure that students can find as many electronic materials through their phones to not place a burden on family plans.

== Engagement of youth ==
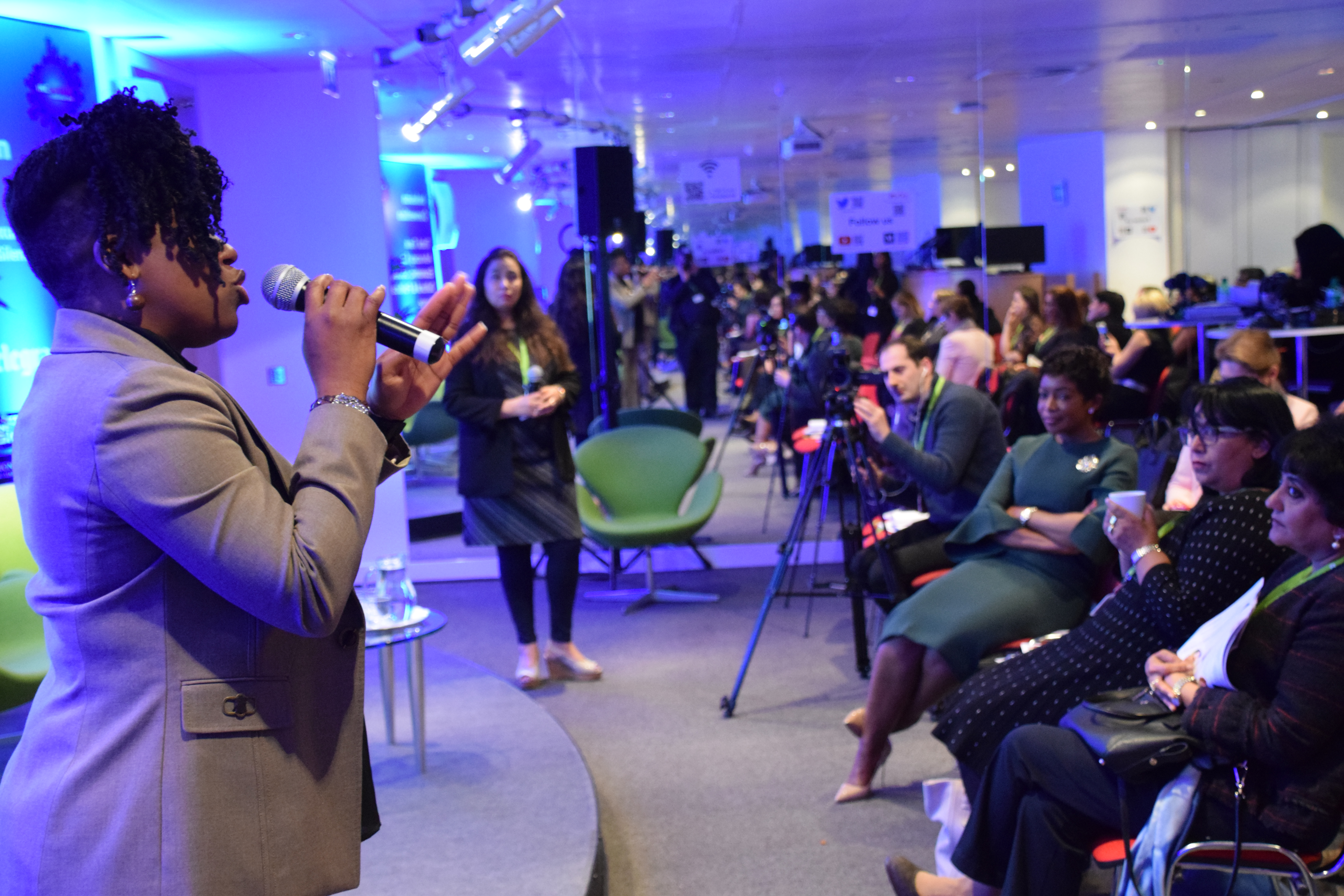
At the 2018 Institutional Convention, Shola Mos-Shogbamimu, founder of the convention, discusses the role of digital media in preventing the spread of sexual harassment and what measures can be taken to stop the spread of negativity in youth.

A recent survey revealed that teenagers and young adults spend more time on the internet than watching TV. This has raised a number of concerns about how internet use could impact cognitive abilities. According to a study by Wartella et al., teens are concerned about how digital technologies may have an impact on their health. Digital youth can generally be viewed as the test market for the next generation's digital content and services. Sites such as Myspace and Facebook have come to the fore in sites where youth participate and engage with others on the internet. However, due to the lack of popularity of MySpace in particular, more young people are turning to websites such as Snapchat, Instagram, and YouTube. It was reported that teenagers spend up to nine hours a day online, with the vast majority of that time spent on social media websites from mobile devices, contributing to the ease of access and availability to young people. Vast amounts of money are spent annually to research the demographic by hiring psychologists, sociologists and anthropologists in order to discover habits, values and fields of interest.

Particularly in the United States, "Social media use has become so pervasive in the lives of American teens that having a presence on a social network is almost synonymous with being online; 95% of all teens ages 12-17 are now online and 80% of those online teens are users of social media sites". However, movements such as these appear to benefit strictly those wishing to advocate for their business towards youth. The critical time when young people are developing their civic identities is between the ages 15–22. During this time they develop three attributes, civic literacy, civic skills and civic attachment, that constitute civic engagement later reflected in political actions of their adult lives.

For youth to fully participate and realize their presence on the internet, a quality level of reading comprehension is required. "The average government web site, for example, requires an eleventh-grade level of reading comprehension, even though about half of the U.S. population reads at an eighth-grade level or lower". So despite the internet being a place irrespective of certain factors such as race, religion, and class, education plays a large part in a person's capacity to present themselves online in a formal manner conducive towards their citizenry. Concurrently, education also affects people's motivation to participate online.

Students should be encouraged to use technology with responsibility and ethical digital citizenship promoted. Education on harmful viruses and other malware must be emphasized to protect resources. A student can be a successful digital citizen with the help of educators, parents, and school counselors.

These 5 competencies will assist and support teachers in teaching about digital citizenship:

- Inclusive: Openness to hearing and recognizing multiple viewpoints and engaging with others online with respect and empathy.
- Informed: Evaluating the accuracy, perspective, and validity of digital media and social posts.
- Engaged: use technology and digital channels for civic engagement, to solve problems and be a force for good in both physical and virtual communities.
- Balanced: I make informed decisions about how to prioritize my time and activities online and off.
- Alert: I am aware of my online actions, and know how to be safe and create safe spaces for others online.

== Limits on the use of data ==
International OECD guidelines state that "personal data should be relevant to the purposes for which they are to be used, and to the extent necessary for those purposes should be accurate, complete, and kept up to date". Article 8 prevents subjects to certain exceptions. Meaning that certain things cannot be published online revealing race, ethnicity, religion, political stance, health, and sex life. in the United States, this is enforced generally by the Federal Trade Commission (FTC)- but very generally. For example, the FTC brought an action against Microsoft for failing to properly protect customers' personal information. In addition, many have described the United States as being in a cyberwar with Russia, and several Americans have credited Russia to their country's downfall in transparency and declining trust in the government. With several foreign users posting anonymous information through social media in order to gather a following, it is difficult to understand whom to target and what affiliation or root cause they may have of performing a particular action aimed to sway public opinion.

The FTC does play a significant role in protecting the digital citizen. However, individuals' public records are increasingly useful to the government and highly sought after. This material can help the government detect a variety of crimes such as fraud, drug distribution rings, terrorist cells. it makes it easier to properly profile a suspected criminal and keep an eye on them. Although there are a variety of ways to gather information on an individual through credit card history, employment history, and more, the internet is becoming the most desirable information gatherer thanks to its façade of security and the amount of information that can be stored on the internet. Anonymity has proven to be very rare online as ISPs can keep track of an individual's activity online.

== Three principles and nine elements of digital citizenship ==
Digital citizenship is a term used to define the appropriate and responsible use of technology among users. Three principles were developed by Mike Ribble to teach digital users how to responsibly use technology to become a digital citizen: respect, educate, and protect. Each principle contains three of the nine elements of digital citizenship.

1. Respect: the elements of etiquette, access, and law are used to respect other digital users.
2. Educate: the elements of literacy, communication, and commerce are used to learn about the appropriate use of the digital world.
3. Protect: the elements of rights and responsibilities, security, and health and wellness are used to remain safe in the digital and non-digital world.

Within these three core principles, there are nine elements to also be considered in regards to digital citizenship:

1. Digital access: This is perhaps one of the most fundamental blocks to being a digital citizen. However, due to socioeconomic status, location, and other disabilities, some individuals may not have digital access. Recently, schools have been becoming more connected with the internet, often offering computers, and other forms of access. This can be offered through kiosks, community centers, and open labs. This most often is associated with the digital divide and factors associated with such. Digital access is available in many remote countries via cyber cafés and small coffee shops.
2. Digital commerce: This is the ability for users to recognize that much of the economy is regulated online. It also deals with the understanding of the dangers and benefits of online buying, using credit cards online, and so forth. As with the advantages and legal activities- there is also dangerous activities such as illegal downloads, gambling, drug deals, pornography, plagiarism, and so forth.
3. Digital communication: This element deals with understanding the variety of online communication mediums such as email, instant messaging, Facebook Messenger, and so forth. There is a standard of etiquette associated with each medium.
4. Digital literacy: This deals with the understanding of how to use various digital devices. For example, how to properly search for something on a search engine versus an online database, or how to use various online logs. Oftentimes many educational institutions will help form an individual's digital literacy.
5. Digital etiquette: As discussed in the third element, digital communication, this is the expectation that various mediums require a variety of etiquette. Certain mediums demand more appropriate behavior and language than others.
6. Digital law: This is where enforcement occurs for illegal downloads, plagiarizing, hacking, creating viruses, sending spam, identity theft, cyberbullying, etc.
7. Digital rights and responsibilities: This is the set of rights that digital citizens have, such as privacy and free speech.
8. Digital health: Digital citizens must be aware of the physical stress placed on their bodies by internet usage. They must be aware to not become overly dependent on the internet causing problems such as eye strain, headaches, and stress.
9. Digital security: This simply means that citizens must take measures to be safe by practicing using secure passwords, virus protection, backing up data, and so forth.

== Digital citizenship in education ==
According to Mike Ribble, an author who has worked on the topic of digital citizenship for more than a decade, digital access is the first element that is prevalent in today's educational curriculum. He cited a widening gap between the impoverished and the wealthy, as 41% of African Americans and Hispanics use computers in the home when compared to 77% of white students. Other crucial digital elements include commerce, communication, literacy, and etiquette. He also emphasized that educators must understand that technology is important for all students, not only those who already have access to it, in order to decrease the digital divide that currently exists.

Furthermore, in research brought up by Common Sense Media, approximately six out of ten American K-12 teachers used some type of digital citizenship curriculum, and seven out of ten taught some sort of competency skill utilizing digital citizenship. Many of the sections that these teachers focused in on included hate speech, cyberbullying, and digital drama. A problem with digital technology that still exists is that over 35% of students were observed to not possess the proper skills to critically evaluate information online, and these issues and statistics increased as the grade levels rose. Online videos such as those found on YouTube and Netflix have been used approximately by 60% of the K-12 teachers in classrooms, while educational tools such as Microsoft Office and Google G Suite have been used by around half of the teachers. Social media was used the least, at around 13% in comparison to other digital methods of education. When analyzing the social class differences between schools, it was found that Title I schools were more likely to use digital citizenship curricula than teachers in more affluent schools.

In the past two years, there has been a major shift to move students from digital citizenship to digital leadership in order to make a greater impact on online interactions. Though digital citizens take a responsible approach to act ethically, digital leadership is a more proactive approach, encompassing the "use of internet and social media to improve the lives, well-being, and circumstances of others" as part of one's daily life. In February 2018, after the Valentine's Day shooting in Parkland, Florida, students became dynamic digital citizens, using social media and other web platforms to engage proactively on the issue and push back against cyberbullies and misinformation. Students from Marjory Stoneman Douglas High School specifically rallied against gun violence, engaging in live tweeting, texting, videoing, and recording the attack as it happened, utilizing onside digital tools to not only witness what was happening at the time but to allow the world to witness it as well. This allowed wider public awareness and response, and as a result, students built a web page and logo for their new movement. They gave interviews to major media outlets and at rallies and protects and coordinated a nationwide march online on March 24 against elected officials at meetings and town halls. The idea of this shift in youth is to express empathy beyond one's self, and moving to seeing this self in the digital company of others.

Nonetheless, several critics state that just as empathy can be spread to a vast number of individuals, hatred can be spread as well. Though the United Nations and groups have been establishing fronts against hate speech, there is no legal definition of hate speech used internationally, and more research needs to be done on its impact.

Along with educational trends, there are overlapping goals of digital citizenship education. Altogether, these facets contribute to one another in the development of a healthy and effective education for digital technology and communication.

1. Digital footprint: An acknowledgment that posting and receiving information online can be tracked, customized, and marketed for users to click and follow. Not only the internet use but individuals' digital footprints can lead to both beneficial and negative outcomes, but the ability to manage one's digital footprints can be a sub-part of digital literacy. Digital footprints do not simply consist of the active participation of content production as well as sharing of ideas on different media sites, but they can also be generated by other internet users (both active and passive forms of digital participation). Examples of digital footprints includes liking, favoriting, following, or commenting on a certain online content creation, or other data can be found by searching through history, purchases, and searches.
2. Digital literacy: Almost 20 years ago, Gilster (1997) defined digital literacy as "the ability to understand and use information in multiple formats from a wide range of sources when it is presented via computers." Digital literacy includes the locating and consumption of content online, the creation of content, and the way that this content is communicated amongst a group of people.
3. Information literacy: The American Library Association defines information literacy as the overall ability for an individual to target information that is valuable, being able to find it, evaluate it, and use it. This can be through information creation, research, scholarly conversations, or simply plugging in keywords into a search engine.
4. Copyright, intellectual property respect, attribution: By knowing who published sources and whether or not content creation is credible, users can be better educated as to what and what not to believe when engaging in digital participation.
5. Health and wellness: A healthy community allows for an interactive conversation to take place between educated citizens who are knowledgeable about their environment.
6. Empowering student voice, agency, advocacy: Utilizing nonprofits as well as government-affiliated organizations in order to empower students to speak up for policy changes that need to be made. Currently, more than 10 different mobile applications aim to allow students the opportunity to speak up and advocate for rights online.
7. Safety, security and privacy: Addressing freedoms extended to everyone in a digital world and the balance between the right to privacy and the safety hazards that go along with it. This area of digital citizenship includes the assistance of students to understand when they are provided the right opportunities, including the proper access to the internet and products that are sold online. It is on the part of educators to assist students in understanding that it is crucial to protect others online.
8. Character education and ethics: Knowing that ethically speaking, everyone will come with different viewpoints online and it is crucial to remain balanced and moral in online behavior.
9. Parenting: Emphasizing the efforts of educators, many want to continue preaching rules and policies addressing issues related to the online world. Cyberbullying, sexting, and other negative issues that are brought up are regulated by the School Resource Officers and other school counsel.
10. Parents posting about their kids online: Digital footprints have lasting impacts on reputation that can affect relationships, employment, opportunities. For example, negatively, a post can impact a child's college admissions or ruin relationship. However, positively, a post could influence their future or help their relationship. Parent tend to post their child picture, achievement, ultrasound, or even flyer. However, "technology coupled with parents’ behavior is increasingly putting children at risk for identity theft, humiliation, various privacy violations, future discrimination, and causing concern about developmental issues related to autonomy and consent." Though the posts are innocent and positive, parents still can the biggest invaders of privacy when it come to their child.

=== Digital Citizenship Curricula ===
There are free and open curricula developed by different organizations for teaching Digital Citizenship skills in schools:

1. Be Internet Awesome: Developed by Google in collaboration with The Net Safety Collaborative, and the Internet Keep Safe Coalition.
2. Digital Citizenship Curriculum: Developed by Common Sense Media, licensed under Creative Commons License CC-BY-NC-ND.
3. Open Curriculum for Teaching Digital Citizenship & Internet Maturity: Developed by iMature EdTech, licensed under Creative Commons License CC-BY-NC-ND.

== See also ==
- Civic technology
- Digital integrity
- Digital self-determination
- E-government
- Open government
- Service design
- Netizen
- Digital native
- Digital Literacy
