= Kenneth Cukier =

American journalist and author (born 1968)

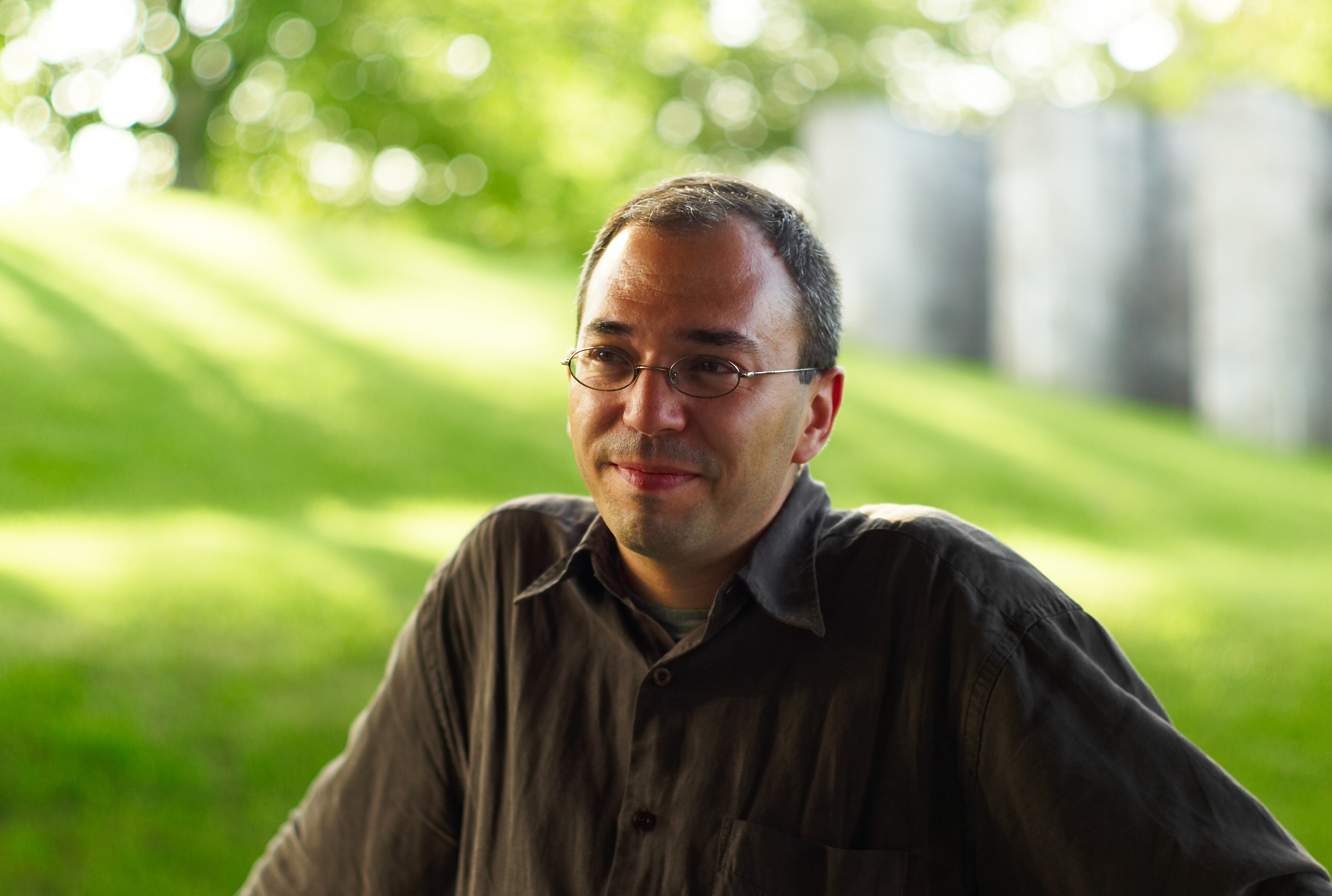
- Occupation: Journalist
- Notable work: Big Data: A Revolution that Will Transform How We Work, Live and Think
- Board member of: International Bridges to Justice (2008-); The Open String Foundation (2015-)

Kenneth Neil Cukier (born 1968) is an American journalist and author of books on technology and society. He is best known for his work at The Economist and the book Big Data: A Revolution that Will Transform How We Work, Live and Think, coauthored with Viktor Mayer-Schönberger and published by Houghton Mifflin Harcourt in 2013.

== Career ==
He has also written for The New York Times, Financial Times, Foreign Affairs and other publications. He was technology editor of the Wall Street Journal Asia edition in Hong Kong in 2001. In 1999 he coined the term "Frenchelon" to describe the French government's surveillance capabilities.

He teaches a course on AI and religion at the Woodbrooke Centre, a Quaker learning institute in Britain, based on talks he has given at DLD and the UN AI4Good conference in 2025. He is on the expert advisory committee of AIandFaith.org, a nonprofit organization of theologians and technologists.

== Publications ==
Big Data was a New York Times bestseller, translated into 21 languages and a finalist for the Financial Times and McKinsey Business Book of the Year Award. The pair published a follow-on work in 2014, Learning With Big Data: The Future of Education. In 2021 Cukier published Framers: Human Advantage in an Age of Technology and Turmoil on the power of mental models and the limits of artificial intelligence with Mayer-Schönberger and a third coauthor, Francis de Véricourt.

== Media ==
"Privacy was the central challenge in a small-data era. In the big data age, the challenge will be safeguarding free will, moral choice, human volition, human agency."

— Cukier. 2016. Ted Radio Hour with Guy Raz

In a radio interview in September 2016, Cukier described the current big data revolution as an agent of change similar to the Gutenberg press and the Printing Revolution. He cautioned that while there will be huge benefits, there is a need to have limitations in place to "preserve our fundamental freedoms" and to prevent Big Data from being another version of Orwell's Big Brother.

== Boards ==
In 2008 he was named to the board of directors of International Bridges to Justice. In 2015 he joined the board of The Open String Foundation, which provides classical instruments to disadvantaged children.

== Affiliations ==
In 2016 he was elected a trustee of Chatham House, a British international affairs institute. In 2017 he was named an associate fellow at Oxford University's Said Business School, where he has run sessions on artificial intelligence and business.

== Awards ==
He received an honorary doctorate of humane letters from Wittenberg University in Springfield, Ohio.
