= Ascriptivism =

Ascriptivism is the view that human beings are to be held responsible for their social actions. Ascriptivists hold that to say 'an action was voluntary on the part of an agent' is not to describe 'the act as caused in a certain way', but to ascribe it to the agent, or to hold the agent responsible for it.
