= Viktor Mayer-Schönberger =

Austrian academic (born 1966)

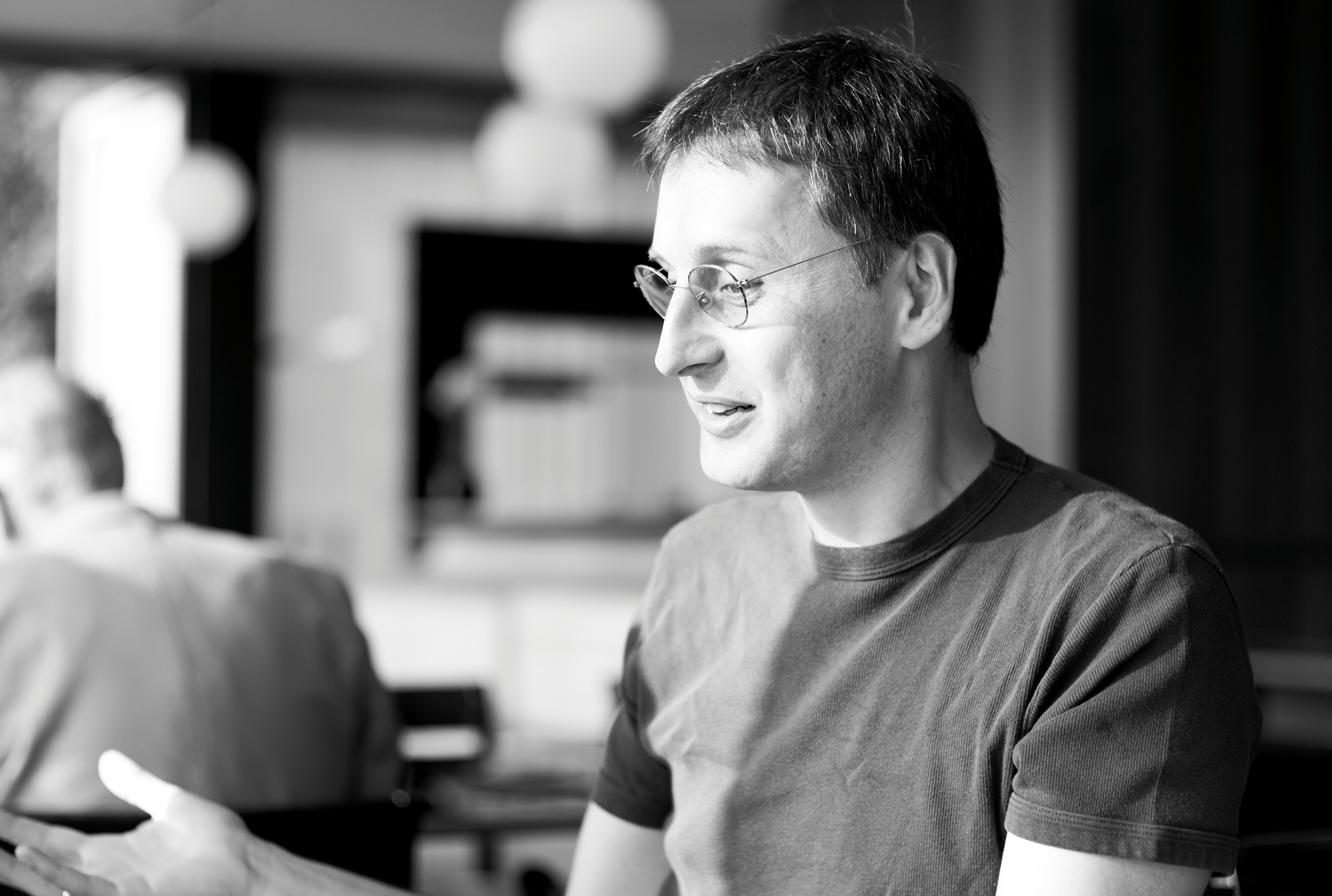
- Born: 1966 (age 59–60); Zell am See, Austria
- Education: University of Salzburg (MJur, DJur); Harvard Law School (LLM); London School of Economics (MSc); University of Graz (DSc)
- Scientific career
- Workplaces: Harvard University; National University of Singapore; University of Oxford
- Thesis: Die Operationalisierung des Gleichheitsgrundsatzes in Oesterreich und den USA (1991)
- Website: www.vmsweb.net

Viktor Mayer-Schönberger (born 1966) is Professor of Internet Governance and Regulation at the Oxford Internet Institute, University of Oxford. He conducts research into the network economy. Earlier he spent ten years on the faculty of Harvard's John F. Kennedy School of Government. He is the co-author of Big Data: A Revolution That Will Transform How We Live, Work, and Think (HMH, 2013) and author of Delete: The Virtue of Forgetting in the Digital Age (Princeton, 2009), which won the 2010 Marshall McLuhan Award for Outstanding Book and the 2010 Don K. Price Award for Best Book in Science and Technology Politics, and has written over a hundred articles and book chapters. He is a member of Germany's Digital Council, advising Angela Merkel and her cabinet.

== Biography ==
Mayer-Schönberger was born in 1966 in Zell am See, Austria, where his mother owned a local cinema. After leaving secondary school in his hometown, he studied law for seven terms at the University of Salzburg. During this time, he competed successfully in the International Physics Olympiad and the Austrian Young Programmers Contest.

In 1986, he founded Ikarus Software and developed Virus Utilities, one of the best-selling software products in Austria. He subsequently earned law degrees at the University of Salzburg (Mag.iur., '88, Dr. iur. '91) and at Harvard Law School (LL.M. '89). In 1992 he received a M.Sc. (Econ) from the London School of Economics, and in 2001 the venia docendi on (among others) information law at the University of Graz. He also worked in his father's accounting business.

In 1998 he joined the faculty of Harvard Kennedy School, where he worked and taught for ten years. After three years at Lee Kuan Yew School of Public Policy, National University of Singapore, Mayer-Schönberger currently holds the Chair of Internet Governance and Regulation at the Oxford Internet Institute. He has been advising businesses, governments and international organisations.

== Work ==
Mayer-Schönberger's research focuses on the role of information in the networked economy. Among other things, he has been studying data privacy, governance in virtual worlds, law and entrepreneurship, e-government, and (more recently) big data.

He has been advocating a right to be forgotten in the form of expiration dates on personal information.

== Awards ==
- 1991 - Top-5 Software Entrepreneur in Austria
- 2000 - Person of the Year for the State of Salzburg
- 2010 - Marshall McLuhan Award for Outstanding Book in the field of media ecology
- 2010 - Don K. Price Award
- 2013 - Financial Times and Goldman Sachs Business Book of the Year Award, shortlisted for Big Data
- 2018 - getAbstract Business Book of the Year Award, shortlisted for Reinventing Capitalism in the Age of Big Data
- 2018 - Best Business Books 2018: Innovation for Reinventing Capitalism in the Age of Big Data

== Recent publications ==
- Das Recht am Info-Highway, LexisNexis, 1997, ISBN 370071131X
- Information und Recht, Vom Datenschutz bis zum Urheberrecht, Springer, 2000, ISBN 3211834567
- Datenschutzgesetz, Linde, 2006 ISBN 3-7073-0869-3
- Delete: The Virtue of Forgetting in the Digital Age, Princeton University Press, 2009, ISBN 9780691138619
- Big Data: A Revolution That Transforms How we Work, Live, and Think" (with Kenneth Cukier), Houghton Mifflin Harcourt, 2012, ISBN 978-0544002692
- Reinventing Capitalism in the Age of Big Data (with Thomas Ramge), Hodder & Stoughton General Division, 2018, ISBN 1473656508
- Guardrails: Guiding Human Decisions in the Age of AI (with Urs Gasser), Princeton University Press, 2023, ISBN 9780691150680
