= Digital Government Authority =

Saudi government agency

- هيئة الحكومة الرقمية

Agency overview
- Formed: March 2021
- Jurisdiction: Saudi Arabia
- Headquarters: Riyadh, Saudi Arabia
- Agency executives: Abdullah Alswaha, Chairman of the Board; Ahmed Alsuwaiyan, Governor
- Website: dga.gov.sa/en

The Digital Government Authority (DGA) is a Saudi government body responsible for regulating and supervising digital government in Saudi Arabia. Its establishment was approved by the Council of Ministers in March 2021.

== History ==
The Council of Ministers approved the creation of the Digital Government Authority in March 2021. The authority consolidated functions previously carried out through earlier Saudi e-government initiatives, including the Yesser programme and the Deem government cloud platform. Commentators noted at the time that the division of responsibilities between the new authority and the Saudi Authority for Data and Artificial Intelligence had not been fully clarified.

In November 2021 the authority launched a regulatory sandbox for government technology companies. According to the authority, the initiative was intended to address intellectual property protection, data sharing between government agencies, and the standardisation of procedures.

== Organisation ==
The authority's board of directors is chaired by the Saudi Minister of Communications and Information Technology, Abdullah Alswaha. Its governor is Ahmed bin Mohammed Alsuwaiyan.

== Mandate ==
The authority's responsibilities include preparing the national digital government strategy, supervising government digital platforms and services, setting technical standards for government digital transformation, and overseeing the government cloud.

Its board approved a regulatory framework for digital government based on eight principles, among them the "once-only" principle, "digital by design", and a "mobile first" approach. The framework is accompanied by a Digital Government Policy supported by five subsidiary policies covering digital governance, whole-of-government platforms, the service lifecycle, beneficiary-focused design, and technology infrastructure. A draft of the policy was published for public consultation on the Istitlaa platform.

== Whole of Government programme ==
The authority began an initiative in 2022 to consolidate government digital services. By the end of the first half of 2025 the number of Saudi government portals had been reduced from 817 to 550, with 267 platforms closed and integrated. The programme introduced shared technical standards, including a national single sign-on system, electronic payment gateways and a government integration channel. All platforms are required to follow a unified design standard known as the Platform Code.

== International assessments ==
Saudi Arabia advanced 25 places in the United Nations E-Government Development Index published in 2024. In the same survey it ranked fourth globally in the Online Services Index and seventh in the E-Participation Index, while Riyadh placed third among 193 cities assessed. Reporting on the results credited the Digital Government Authority with coordinating the underlying initiatives together with other government bodies.

In the World Bank's GovTech Maturity Index for 2025, which covered 197 countries, Saudi Arabia ranked second globally with an overall score of 99.64 per cent, placing it in the index's "very advanced" group. The country had ranked 49th in 2020 and third in 2022.

== International cooperation ==
In May 2026 the authority and the United Nations Department of Economic and Social Affairs signed a letter of intent to establish a United Nations-affiliated digital government centre headquartered in Riyadh. The agreement was signed on the sidelines of the United Nations Science, Technology and Innovation Forum in New York. The centre is intended to develop frameworks, standards and best practices in digital government and to support member states in building digital strategies aligned with the Sustainable Development Goals.

== See also ==
- E-Government in Saudi Arabia
- Saudi Vision 2030
- Ahmed Alsuwaiyan
- Saudi Authority for Data and Artificial Intelligence
