= E-Government in Saudi Arabia =

Government digitisation policy

Logo of the Digital Government Authority of Saudi Arabia

The e-Government in Saudi Arabia was established as per Royal Decree No. 7/B/33181 dated 7 September 2003. The e-Government was created by the Ministry of Communications and Information Technology. In 2005, the Ministry of Communications and Information Technology created the e-Government Program Yesser with the ministry of finance and the Communications and Information Technology Commission. The portal offers around 2500 services for people of Saudi Arabia. The main goal of the service is to facilitate the transactions of citizens, residents and visitors by providing a quick and sufficient assistance. Moreover, Yesser contributes to encouraging governmental agencies in achieving a sustainable progress by improving efficiency and capacity.

In an assessment undertaken by the United Nations e-Government Survey, Riyadh, Saudi Arabia, was ranked the 30th among 40 other cities.

In August 2019, Saudi Arabia announced a royal decree to establish the Saudi Authority for Data and Artificial Intelligence to support the innovation and digital transformation in the country. Two more agencies were created and linked with the authority to achieve the Kingdom's vision 2030. These agencies are: "The National Centre for Artificial Intelligence" and "The National Data Management Office.

== Absher ==
In 2015, the Saudi Ministry of Interior introduced the smartphone application "Absher" that provides 160 e-services to citizens and residents of Saudi Arabia. Among the services that has been recently added to Absher is a service that allows users to file an electronic complaint against any traffic violation.

== Watani ==
In 2019, the National Center for Performance Measurement (ADAA) is Saudi Arabia introduced a smartphone application designed to take the feedback of citizens, residents and visitors about the e-services provided by different governmental agencies. The app has been given the name of “Watani” and it is available in apple and android stores.

== Med Consult ==
”Med Consult” is an application launched by the Saudi Ministry of Health. The main objective of the app is to decrease diagnostic mistakes and improve the safety of patients. The app uses visual communication techniques to connect between medical practitioners in less developed countries and consultants worldwide. It was launched in collaboration with the WHO and KSRelief.

== E-visa ==
In the framework of the Saudi Vision 2030, the first e-visa project has been launched by the Saudi Ministry in Jordan in 2019. The main aim of the project is to provide pilgrims with the best and top-class service. Moreover, all different Saudi missionaries worldwide are now preparing themselves to implement e-visa application for tourists wishing to visit the country and attend the various activities take place there.

=== Hajj and Umrah E-Visas ===
In 2019, the Saudi Ministry of Hajj and Umrah started the operation of issuing e-visa to Muslims seeking to perform Hajj and Umrah worldwide. Such an electronic visa would replace the process of visiting an agency and getting the passports checked by the Saudi embassies.

=== Instant Tourism Visa ===
It is an online e-visa issuance system that has been launched by the Saudi Authorities in 2019. The main aim of the visa is to encourage people wishing to attend "Jeddah Season" tourism festival. The visa can be processed and issued within 3 minutes provided that the applicant shall buy a ticket for at least one of Jeddah Season's events.

== E-marriage Contracts ==
The Saudi Ministry of Justice has started to issue online marriage contract through the ministry's websites. The main aim of this service is to facilitate and accelerate the marriage procedures.

== E-Power of Attorney Service ==
The Saudi Ministry of Justice has launched an electronic service that allows Saudi citizens living outside Saudi Arabia to set up their power of attorney online. This step has been taken in collaboration with the Saudi Ministry of Foreign Affairs as the transaction should be processed in the Saudi international missions.

== Online Health Services Platform ==
The Saudi Health Attaché in the UK announced that an online health services platform is planned to be launched to serve Saudi patients receiving medical treatment in the UK. The platform will give patients the chance to complete a number of transactions without the need to communicate with the health Attaché. Such services include financial guarantees, screenings, statements and other services.

== Intelligent Hajj ==
Intelligent Hajj is a program launched by the government of Saudi Arabia and tailored to assist pilgrims. The main goal of the program is to provide pilgrims with the best digital services during their journey.

== Musaned ==
Musaned is an electronic platform launched by the Saudi Ministry of Labor and Social Development. The main job of the platform is to facilitate the employment of domestic labors and the issuance of their visas.

== Najiz ==
Najiz is the electronic portal of the Saudi Ministry of Justice. It is an e-notarization system that helps reducing paper work and facilitating clients transactions without the need to visit courts.

== Mortgage E-authentication ==
The Justice Ministry launched in its website a mortgage e-authentication that allows users to verify the validity and effectiveness of a mortgage before visiting the notary. Moreover, users can transfer property ownership within an hour by using the service. Other services include applying for vacating property and updating a mortgage to an e-mortgage.

== Esal ==
It is an online bill issuance and payment platform for businesses in Saudi Arabia. It was launched by Saudi Arabia Monetary Authority (SAMA) as a contribution to the Saudi Vision 2030.

== See also ==
- Government of Saudi Arabia
