= Reachware =

Saudi automation and systems integration company

- Company type: Private
- Founded: 2021
- Headquarters: Riyadh, Saudi Arabia
- Services: Automation and systems integration
- Website: reachware.com

Reachware (Arabic: ريتشوير) is a Saudi company founded in 2021 and based in Riyadh, specializing in automation and systems integration.

== History ==
Reachware was founded in 2021 by Hamza Abusitta and Maysarah Mashaal. In February 2023, Hospitality Solutions company signed a partnership agreement with Reachware to facilitate technical integration between the Wadak booking platform and other cloud applications serving the food and beverage sector. The agreement was signed by Hospitality Solutions CEO, Athbi Al Aqeel, and Reachware CEO, Hamza Abusitta.

In August 2024, WalaPlus partnered with Reachware to upgrade its loyalty programs. In September, Reachware announced a $3 million funding round, led by Sado Capital, with participation from 500 Sanabil Investments and Elm. In February 2025, Reachware announced a partnership agreement with PayMob.

== Awards and recognitions ==
In 2023, Reachware was named Best Startup in Saudi Arabia at the Startup Middle East Awards, held in the Emirate of Ras Al Khaimah, UAE.

In August 2024, Reachware was selected by KPMG as one of eight Saudi startups to participate in the Global Finals for Technology Innovators. In November, Reachware received two awards from International Business Magazine, the Best iPaaS Company in the Middle East for 2024 and the Best Connectivity Platform as a Service (iPaaS) in Saudi Arabia for 2024.
