= E-taxes =

E-taxes can refer to:

- The taxes imposed on goods and services traded online; see e-commerce
- The taxes imposed on information technology products ("digital" goods and services)

== See also ==
- EGovernment
- ECommerce
