= EKosova =

Official digital services portal of the Government of Kosovo

eKosova
- Type: E-government
- Location: Pristina
- Region served: Republic of Kosovo
- Official language: Albanian, English, Serbian
- Parent organization: Kosovo National Agency for Information Society
- Website: eKosova.rks-gov.net

e-Kosova Electronic Services Platform, commonly known as eKosova, is the official online portal of the Government of Kosovo. It enables citizens, businesses, and public administration employees to access a wide range of public services electronically. The platform was established as part of the government's strategic commitment to improve administrative service delivery through e-governance, ensuring accessible, efficient, and transparent public services.

== Background ==
The creation of eKosova is based on key national strategies, including the 2016–2021 National Development Strategy, the 2020–2023 Government Program, and the 2015–2020 Strategy for Modernization of Public Administration. These frameworks prioritize digital transformation, the use of Information and Communication Technology (ICT), and administrative modernization to simplify procedures, reduce public spending, and increase service quality.

== Services and features ==
eKosova serves as a single digital gateway for public services offered by Kosovo's institutions. It allows users to access services 24/7, obtain information on procedures and required documents, and make online payments through debit or credit cards. The platform complies with cybersecurity standards to protect user data and integrates with the Platforma e Interoperabilitetit (Interoperability Platform), which enables the interaction of electronic registers across institutions.

The portal is available in three languages: Albanian, English, and Serbian. It has recorded over 1.6 billion visits and 1.2 million registered users. Service usage statistics include over 6.8 million tax-related transactions, 2.5 million health service interactions, 3.3 million vehicle services, and 3.1 million civil registry actions. eKosova is also accessible through its mobile application, available on Google Play and the App Store.

== Administration ==
The platform is managed and administered by the Kosovo National Agency for Information Society.

It is accessible to:

- All citizens of the Republic of Kosovo
- Registered businesses
- Public administration employees through Active Directory
- Visitors seeking information or services

User support is provided through multiple communication channels, including forum, email, social media, and two dedicated phone numbers: 038 200 30 900 and 0800 30 900. eKosova is considered a central tool for Kosovo's digital governance and administrative reform.

== Legal framework ==
The operation of eKosova is regulated by Kosovo's legal framework governing electronic communications, data protection, and digital public services. Its functions and responsibilities are defined by relevant legislation and strategic documents adopted by the Government of Kosovo.
