= Unified national access =

Saudi national digital identity system

Nafath
- Other names: Unified National Access
- Original author(s): National Information Center of the Kingdom of Saudi Arabia (NIC)
- Developer(s): Elm Company; Technology Control Company
- Initial release: 28 November 2016
- Available in: English, Arabic
- Website: www.iam.gov.sa

Unified National Access, (Nafath; Arabic: نفاذ) is a Saudi national digital identity system that allow Saudi citizens and residents to use an Absher account as single sign-on identity provider service providing basic information about the individual to the beneficiary and verifiying their status of residency or citizenship. The program was announced on 28 November 2016 by the Saudi Ministry of Interior to simplify and modernize log-in into governmental services.

The Nafath project was started at the Ministry of Interior together within National Information Center of the Kingdom of Saudi Arabia, develop and implemented by Elm Company and Technology Control Company, The system is interconnected with over 530 government and private platforms and applications.

Since its inception, Nafath has executed more than 3 billion verification operations as of November 2024.

== Overview ==
=== Nafath SSO ===
The purpose of Nafath Identity Access Management project (Nafath IAM) also known as (Saudi National Digital Identity) is preparing the infrastructure that needed to make information of digital identity secure, sharable and exchangeable between other digital platforms and services allowing users to use the same user credentials (Absher Account) with all other platforms.

=== Nafath app ===
A Nafath application was launched to complement the desktop version, using biometric information, passkeys, and request codes to manage the authentication and authorization of sign-ons. Additionally, the app has logs of recent request history.

== See also ==
- Absher (application)
- National identity
