= Comat Technologies =

Comat Technologies Private Limited
- Company type: Social enterprise
- Industry: Rural development
- Founded: 1996
- Headquarters: Bangalore, India
- Number of locations: 800 (2008)
- Area served: India
- Number of employees: over 3000
- Website: comat.com

Comat is an Indian social enterprise specializing in the delivery of information based services to rural citizens in India. It was founded in 1996 and currently has over 1500 rural centers from which it serves over 75,000 citizens each day. In June 2011, Comat was acquired by Glodyn Technoserve, an IT services company headquartered in Mumbai, India. The company's prior investors included Omidyar Network, Avigo Capital and Elevar Equity.

== Services ==
Comat has been involved in several projects that have eased people's access to essential information based services, especially in the State of Karnataka. The Company provides Government, Education and Financial Services to rural citizens through 1500 Rural Business Centers set up as part of Project Nemmadi, an expansion of the Rural Digital Services pilot. Comat has also been involved in the digitization of over 20 million land records (Bhoomi (software)), that has benefited over 6.7 million farmers in the State.

In partnership with the department of Food, Civil Supplies and Consumer Affairs, Comat has created a biometric database of over 45 million citizens living in Karnataka. This is the largest electronic citizen database in India and can act as the stepping stone for the Unique Identification Number. Comat has begun the Proof of Concept for the Unique Identification Number in two districts of Karnataka.
