= E-Government in the United Arab Emirates =

E-Government of UAE

The E-government program in the United Arab Emirates (UAE) is an initiative under the UAE Government Strategy (2010-2013). The initiative aims to contribute toward achieving UAE Vision 2021. The UAE has invested in adopting and implementing information and communications technology (ICT) in its government and private sectors to support the economy and support continued growth in technology and infrastructure.

The contribution of the telecommunications sector to the UAE's economy rose from 4.1% in 2007 to 5.3% in 2010, as according to UAE Telecommunications Sector Developments & Indicators (2007-2010), published in May 2011 by the Telecommunications Regulatory Authority (TRA). The Abu Dhabi Department of Economic Development estimated that investments in the IT and Telecommunications sectors would likely reach 18.4 billion dirhams (US$5 billion) in 2011, up from 16.1 billion dirhams in 2010.

== Inception and timeline ==
The UAE began launching e-services in the early 2000s with E-Dirham in 2001. This service, initiated by the Ministry of Finance, replaced traditional methods of paying and collecting fees for government services. Following this, the government gradually implemented a variety of e-services.

#	Year	Service	Summary	Initiated by
1	February 2001	E-Dirham	The first online service launched by the Ministry of Finance in the federal government replaced the tradition of fee collection for government services.	Ministry of Finance
2	November 2002	E-government Program	The Coordinating Committee for the Federal E-government Programme was formed and led by the Ministry of Finance and Industry.	Ministry of Finance
3	March 2003	E-government Strategy	IBM was assigned to conduct an assessment study for the federal agencies and develop an implementation plan.	Ministry of Finance
4	June 2004	The E-government Implementation Plan	A memorandum of understanding (MOU) was signed with Emirates Telecommunications Corporation (Etisalat) to provide the infrastructure for the E-government.	Ministry of Finance
5	March 2005	E-government Portal	The launch of the first E-government portal in cooperation with Etisalat, which was assigned to implement the plan.	Ministry of Finance
6	March & July 2006	Assigning the Ministry of Government Sector Development to oversee the E-government Programme	A ministerial decree was issued to move the E-government program from the Ministry of Finance to the Ministry of Government Sector Development.	Ministry of Governmental Sector Development
7	June 2008	Development of the Information Systems Strategy of the Federal Government	A ministerial decree assigned the TRA as the lead to develop a strategy for the information systems in the State. TRA, in cooperation with Booz Allen Company, developed the Information Systems Strategy of the Federal Government.	Telecommunications Regulatory Authority
8	2010	Development of the Government Service Development Strategy	The Office of Prime Minister developed a Government Service Development Strategy, which was the third foundational element of the E-government Strategy.	Prime Minister's Office

== The official portal of the UAE Government ==
The official portal of the UAE Government is u.ae (formerly government.ae and govu.ae), which consolidates federal and local e-government services and information and serves as the central online platform for government digital services.

This portal consolidates all e-services provided by the UAE federal and local government bodies. It also offers information on accessing government services through mobile phones and other electronic devices, ATMs, and public payment machines.

The portal provides online access to federal and local E-government services and information for UAE residents, businesses, and visitors.

=== Functions ===
The official portal serves as a single entry point for users to access various federal and local government e-services. It also facilitates communication between users and government representatives, promoting e-participation through forums, blogs, surveys, polls, and social media. u.ae serves as the main portal, encompassing sub-portals for e-participation, e-services, m-services, and the UAE Open Data.

=== E-Services ===
The UAE portal classifies electronic services into categories for individuals, businesses, and visitors to streamline online access. The portal includes a search facility to help users find services and a section on alternate means for accessing government services.

=== Mobile Services ===
The portal provides information on services available through mobile applications. These mobile applications enable access to government services.

=== E-participation ===
The portal includes E-participation channels. The federal portal utilises platforms such as forums, blogs, chats, surveys, polls, and social media tools like Facebook, Twitter, Flickr, and YouTube to engage the public in communication with the government regarding opinions and experiences on government services and policies.

=== Open Data ===
Under Open Data, government data and information are available to the public. This includes access to economic data, population statistics, and other information. Open Data is used by students, economists, researchers, and the general public.

== ICT Infrastructure and Penetration ==
In May 2011, the Telecommunications Regulatory Authority (TRA) reported high levels of mobile and internet penetration in the UAE, metrics often cited as indicators of E-government readiness. With 1,417,519 internet subscribers, the UAE had 196.3 mobile phone subscriptions and 62.4 internet users per 100 inhabitants.

== E-Readiness ranking ==
E-Readiness or Networked Readiness Index (NRI) measures a country's preparedness to deliver government services and information online and the value it provides to the public. E-readiness, or the Readiness Index, involves a government's ability to use Information and Communication Technology (ICT) to improve socioeconomic conditions and public welfare.

=== Global Information Technology Report (GITR) ===
According to the GITR 2010-2011, the UAE was ranked first among Arab countries and 24th among 138 countries reviewed in the NRI. The same report ranked Qatar at 25, Bahrain at 30, Saudi Arabia at 33, and Oman at 41.

According to the Networked Readiness Index (NRI), the UAE improved its ranking by six positions, from 29th among 127 countries reviewed in 2007–2008 to 23rd among 133 countries reviewed in 2009–2010.

=== UN E-Government survey ===
The United Nations Public Administration Network (UNPAN) conducts a similar survey and publishes its report on E-government ranking. The UN E-government Survey report was published annually until 2005 and became a biennial publication thereafter.

The UAE's overall ranking in the UN E-government Survey has varied. The UAE's rank rose for two consecutive surveys, from 60th in 2004 to 42nd in 2005 and 32nd in 2008. However, its rank declined to 49th position in 2010. The UAE was ranked fourth in the region in the 2010 report.

== Emirates E-Government ==
Emirates E-government is responsible for developing, implementing, and maintaining the E-government program at the federal level in the UAE. This involves transforming the delivery of government services electronically through the deployment of Information and communication technologies (ICT).

=== Services ===
Emirates E-government established the UAE's official portal (www.government.ae), which is part of the E-transformation process. This portal consolidates all E-services and information provided by UAE federal and local governments.

Emirates E-government provides services on Government-to-Government (G2G), Government-to-Business (G2B), and Government-to-Citizen (G2C) levels. The UAE's official portal, www.government.ae falls under the G2B and G2C categories. Under G2G services, the entity provides cloud and Government Website Evaluation Index (GWEI) services.

=== Initiatives ===
Emirates E-government develops and implements policies, guidelines, and programs to expand and coordinate E-government services across federal agencies. It supports the use of E-services and information and communication technology (ICT) tools by federal government entities and the public. Emirates E-government holds workshops for internal staff and federal government employees on E-government, cloud services like Morasalat and Malaxate, IT trends, and using ICT to achieve organizational goals.

==== Policies and guidelines ====
Emirates E-government drafted guidelines for federal government entities in the UAE covering websites, social media usage, and web content. Emirates E-government also issued draft documents related to E-participation and open data. These guidelines provide recommendations on content style, design, layout, and accessibility features, aiming to align federal government websites with international standards laid down by the World Wide Web Consortium.

The Guidelines for Social Media Usage were launched in 2011. The guidelines document was prepared in partnership with, and with support from, the Dubai School of Government's Governance and Innovation Program, and in collaboration with UAE Government entities. Advisors from the information technology research and advisory firm Gartner Inc. and United Nations eGovernment Survey team also provided assistance and recommendations.

== Local E-Government Programs ==
E-government initiatives operate at the local level in the UAE. The governments of six of the seven emirates—Abu Dhabi, Dubai, Sharjah, Ras Al Khaimah, Ajman, and Fujairah—have launched official portals.

These portals offer interactive and transactional services like bill payments and license renewals. The Abu Dhabi and Dubai government portals also provide information and guidance to residents, businesses, and visitors on topics like applying for health cards, obtaining driver’s licenses, or applying for visas.

The UAE Government has pursued an electronic transformation (E-transformation) of federal and local services to enhance service delivery and digital access. Sheikh Mohammed bin Rashid Al Maktoum, Vice President and Prime Minister of the UAE and Ruler of Dubai, stated when launching the federal portal that "E-transformation in the UAE and the provision of federal and local services through one portal contributes to enhance the state's competitiveness and opens up broader prospects for direct communication with community groups and work to enhance the effectiveness and efficiency of governmental work in the country."
