= Project Nemmadi =

Project Nemmadi is a program initiated by the State Government of Karnataka, India to provide e-governance services to rural citizens. It was initially piloted in 2003 at fourteen locations under the name Rural Digital Services (RDS). RDS was considered a success, and as a result, the program was expanded into Project Nemmadi, a public-private partnership with Comat Technologies. Between 2006 and 2009, approximately 800 facilities, called Nemmadi centers, were built statewide.

These centers provide services such as the issue of birth, death, income, and caste certificates, ration cards, land records, and pensions.

== See also ==
- Bhoomi
