= E-government factsheets =

E-government factsheets are periodical publications which aim to promote good practice sharing among countries of Europe in the field of delivering electronic services to the benefit of public administrations, businesses and citizens.

Published biannually, e-government factsheets provide a detailed monitoring of the latest e-government developments in 34 European countries (EU-27, Croatia, North Macedonia, Turkey, Iceland, Liechtenstein, Norway and Switzerland) and offer insight and a point of reference for eGovernment practitioners across Europe.

Since December 2014 the factsheets are published on Joinup's National Interoperability Framework Observatory, before that, the factsheets were a part of the European Commission's information and communication policy for the ePractice.eu initiative.

The factsheets pose as an information hub about the progress being made both on a national and European level in the field of e-government services, structured in the following sections:

- Country Profile: Basic data, indicators and e-government State of Play
- eGovernment History: Main historic developments and key milestones
- eGovernment Strategy: Main strategic objectives, principles and visions
- eGovernment Legal Framework: Main legal texts which are impacting the development of eGovernment
- eGovernment Actors: Main roles and responsibilities within national, regional and local governmental bodies
- eGovernment Who's Who: The main decision-makers and executives
- eGovernment Infrastructure: The main infrastructure components
- eGovernment Services for Citizens
- eGovernment Services for Businesses
