= M-government =

Mobile government, or mGovernment refers to collection of services as the strategic use of government services and applications which are only possible using cellular/mobile telephones, laptop computers, personal digital assistants (PDAs) and Wireless internet infrastructure.

== History ==
The world's first mGovernment work initiated by Professor Ibrahim Kushchu in Japan at the mGovLab – now grown into Mobile Government Consortium Int (mGCI) – offering services for the transformation to mGovernment. Proponents of mGovernment services argue it can help make public information and government services available "anytime, anywhere" and that the ubiquity of these devices mandates their employment in government functions. An example of such beneficial use of mobile technologies would be the sending of a mass alert to registered citizens via short message service, or SMS, in the event of an emergency.

Mobile government services cover four areas: adapting e-government services for mobile devices, providing public-sector fieldworkers with mobile technologies and applications, supporting flexible working arrangements, and giving citizens mobile access to government services.

The recent work done by the mGCI suggest that governments all around the world are now looking for strategic ways of implementing mGovernment services rather than implementing silos of solutions at various ministries or agencies.

== Benefits of mGovernment ==
Mobile Government services can be defined "as a strategy and its implementation involving the utilization of all kinds of wireless and mobile technology, services, applications and devices for improving benefits to the parties involved in e-government including citizens, businesses and all government units"

- Cost reduction
- Efficiency
- Transformation/modernization of public sector organizations
- Added convenience and flexibility
- Better services to the citizens
- Ability to reach a larger number of people through mobile devices than would be possible using wired internet only

These benefits can be enriched and analysed under three categories: benefits to the government, citizens and the industry.

== Cases of developing countries ==
In developing where internet penetration is low due to lack of infrastructure and mobile connectivity and penetration is high, m-government is a better option although adoption is an issue. A good government to citizen interaction can be made through tools likes SMS. Following are some of the cases in developing countries:

=== Turkey ===
In Turkey mobile phones have penetrated 23.3 Million (34%) of 69.6 Million populations compared to 4.3 Million (6%) internet users. Even though there is an increase in mobile connections the mobile internet penetration rate is very low. Therefore, the m-government applications are confined to G2G or G2C based on SMS and GPRS technologies. These applications are in their early stages but still are considered to be better than traditional way of service provision. Some of the major mobile application in Turkey are the following:

MOBESE (Mobile Electronic System Integration) – It is a G2G application and is used by law enforcement agency. It connects the law enforcement agency to respective local level Police Station to validate citizen identity or checking their record history etc.

TBS (Traffic Information System) – It Helps in checking offending drivers license and vehicle information.

Local Government Applications – In some municipalities, SMS technology is used by citizens to pay their taxes. They are also used for local level polling.

=== Czech Republic ===
In Czech Republic, mobile phones have penetrated in 95% of the 10 million populations, one of the highest in Europe and probably in the world. Since the penetration of mobile technology is very high, m-government applications are more effective and quick. Many m-government applications are launched and tested for informing citizens about crisis and natural disaster.

One way critical information delivery for citizens – This application is used for alerting citizens through SMS in case of natural or man-made disasters. It is also used for municipality voting or getting citizens consent on any issue.

=== Philippines ===
The mobile phone penetration in Philippines is 23.8% which accounts to 20 million mobile phone users out of 84 million populations. Here m-government applications include G2C and also more interactive C2G applications.

TXT CSC – This is an SMS service launched by Civil Service Commission in Philippines to increase the efficiency and speed of service delivery.

Reporting Criminal Offense – This service is launched in 2002 by Philippine National Police to enable citizens to report criminal offenses by criminals as well as Police to the relevant authorities.

Polling Coverage through SMS – Through SMS and MMS news and updates regarding polling will be provided to the people.

=== India ===
India's Ministry of Communication and Information Technology, Department of Electronics and Information Technology (DeitY) has announced plans for all its department and agencies to develop and deploy mobile applications to provide all their services through mobile devices. Following are the main measures laid down by DeitY:

1. Web sites of all Government Departments and Agencies shall be made mobile-compliant, using the “One Web” approach.

2.Open standards shall be adopted for mobile applications for ensuring the interoperability of applications across various operating systems and devices as per the Government Policy on Open Standards for e-Governance.

3. Uniform/ single pre-designated numbers (long and short codes) shall be used for mobile-based services to ensure convenience.

4. All Government Departments and agencies shall develop and deploy mobile applications for providing all their public services through mobile devices to the extent feasible on the mobile platform. They shall also specify the service levels for such services.

To ensure adoption and implementation of the framework in time bound manner the government will develop Mobile Service Delivery Gateway (MSDG) that is the core infrastructure for enabling the availability of public services in through mobile devices.

== Issues with mGovernment services ==
- Wireless and mobile networks and related infrastructure, as well as software, must be developed
- To increase citizen participation and provide citizen-oriented services, governments need to offer easy access to mGovernment information in alternative forms
- Mobile phone numbers and mobile devices are relatively easily hacked and wireless networks are vulnerable because they use public airwaves to send signals
- Many countries have not yet adopted legislation for data and information practices that spell out the rights of citizens and the responsibilities of the data holders (government)

== Suggestions for mGovernment services development ==
- Perfecting mGovernment relevant laws, regulations and standards
- Establishing the information security system of mGovernment
- Rebuilding and optimizing the administrative business processes
- Strengthening the evaluation of e-Government
