= E-government =

Government utilizing electronic services

E-government (short for electronic government) involves the use of technological devices, such as computers and the Internet, for faster means of delivering public services to citizens and other persons in a country or region. E-government offers new opportunities for more direct and convenient citizen access to government and for government provision of services directly to citizens.

E-government involves digital interactions across various levels and stakeholders (C2G), between governments and other government agencies (G2G), between government and citizens (G2C), between government and employees (G2E), and between government and businesses/commerces (G2B). E-government delivery models can be broken down into the following categories: This interaction consists of citizens communicating with all levels of government (city, state/province, national, and international), facilitating citizen involvement in governance using information and communication technology (ICT) (such as computers and websites) and business process re-engineering (BPR). Brabham and Guth (2017) interviewed the third-party designers of e-government tools in North America about the ideals of user interaction that they build into their technologies, which include progressive values, ubiquitous participation, geolocation, and education of the public.

Other definitions stray from the idea that technology is an object and defines e-government simply as facilitators or instruments and focus on specific changes in public administration issues. The internal transformation of a government is the definition that established the specialist technologist Mauro D. Ríos. In his paper "In Search of a Definition of Electronic Government", he says: "Digital government is a new way of organization and management of public affairs, introducing positive transformational processes in management and the structure itself of the organization chart, adding value to the procedures and services provided, all through the introduction and continued appropriation of information and communication technologies as a facilitator of these transformations."

== Terminology ==
E-government is also known as e-gov, electronic government, Internet governance, digital government, online government, connected government. As of 2014, the OECD used the term digital government, and distinguishes it from e-government in the recommendation produced there for the Network on E-Government of the Public Governance Committee. Several governments have started to use the term digital government to a wide range of services involving contemporary technology, such as big data, automation or predictive analytics.

E-gov strategies (or digital government) is defined as "The employment of the Internet and the world-wide-web for delivering government information and services to the citizens." (United Nations, 2006; AOEMA, 2005). Electronic government (or e-government) essentially refers to "utilization of Information Technology (IT), Information and Communication Technologies (ICTs), and other web-based telecommunication technologies to improve and/or enhance on the efficiency and effectiveness of service delivery in the public sector". E-government is often described as promoting broader stakeholder participation to national and community development, as well as deepen the governance process.

In electronic government systems, government operations are supported by Web-based services. It involves the use of information technology, specifically the Internet, to facilitate the communication between the government and its citizens.

=== Transformational government ===
Transformational government or also transformational e-government is the use of computer-based information and communications technologies (ICT) to change the way governments work. The term is commonly used to describe a government reform strategy which attempts to radically change the way people understand the government, especially those working within the government. For example, it is often associated with a whole-of-government viewpoint, which tries to foster cross-department collaboration and provide one-stop-shop convenience in the delivery of services to citizens.

The term transformational government is usually used aspirationally, as denoting the highest level of what e-government can achieve:

1. presence, where ICT, and usually websites, are used to provide information;
2. interaction, where government interacts with citizens, and departments interact with each other, online especially by email;
3. transaction, where such things as paying taxes or licenses are carried out online;
4. transformation, which involves a reinvention of government functions and how they operate. In relation to developing countries, it is often associated with hopes of reducing corruption, and in relation to developed countries, with attempts to increase the involvement of the private and voluntary sectors in government activity.

=== Government 2.0 ===
Government 2.0 or Gov 2.0 refers to government policies that aim to harness collaborative technologies and interactive Internet tools to create an open-source computing platform in which government, citizens, and innovative companies can improve transparency and efficiency. Put simply, Gov 2.0 is about "putting government in the hands of citizens". Gov 2.0 combines interactive Web 2.0 fundamentals with e-government and increases citizen participation by using open-source platforms, which allow development of innovative apps, websites, and widgets. The government's role is to provide open data, web services, and platforms as an infrastructure.

=== E-governance ===
E-government enables anyone visiting a city website to communicate and interact with city employees via the Internet with graphical user interfaces (GUI), instant messaging (IM), and learn about government issues through audio/video presentations.

The essence of e-governance is "the enhanced value for stakeholders through transformation" and "the use of technology to enhance the access to and delivery of government services to benefit citizens, business partners and employees". The focus should be on:

- The use of information and communication technologies, and particularly the Internet, as a tool to achieve better government.
- The use of information and communication technologies in all facets of the operations of a government organization.
- The continuous optimization of service delivery, constituency participation, and governance by transforming internal and external relationships through technology, the Internet and new media.

Whilst e-government has traditionally been understood as being centered around the operations of government, e-governance is understood to extend the scope by including citizen engagement and participation in governance. As such, following in line with the OECD definition of e-government, e-governance can be defined as the use of ICTs as a tool to achieve better governance.

=== Non-internet e-government ===
While e-government is often thought of as "online government" or "Internet-based government," many non-Internet "electronic government" technologies can be used in this context. Some non-Internet forms include telephone, fax, PDA, SMS text messaging, MMS, wireless networks and services, Bluetooth, CCTV, tracking systems, RFID, biometric identification, road traffic management and regulatory enforcement, identity cards, smart cards and other near-field communication applications; polling station technology (where non-online e-voting is being considered), TV and radio-based delivery of government services (e.g., CSMW), email, online community facilities, newsgroups and electronic mailing lists, online chat, and instant messaging technologies.

== History ==
One of the first references to the term "electronic government" happened alongside the term electronic democracy in 1992. During the last two decades, governments around the world have invested in ICT with the aim of increasing the quality and decreasing the cost of public services. But over that time, as even the least developed countries have moved to websites, e-services and e-government strategies, it has become increasingly clear that e-government has not delivered all the benefits that were hoped for it. One study found that 35% of e-government projects in developing countries resulted in total failures; and that 50% were partial failures.

In reaction to these poor outcomes, there has been a shift of perspective to transformational government, aiming beyond purely technical aspects of better enabling e-government processes towards addressing the cultural and organisational barriers which have hindered public service benefits realisation. Researchers have defined the rationale for transformational government as "the exploitation of e-government such that benefits can be realized".

In 2010, the Organization for the Advancement of Structured Information Standards (OASIS) published a report which identified a wide range of common pitfalls which have hampered many governments in achieving significant impacts through their technology investments. However, OASIS also noted that

"… an increasing number [of governments] are now getting to grips with the much broader and complex set of cultural and organizational changes which are needed for ICT to deliver significant benefits to the public sector. This new approach is generally referred to as Transformational Government."

OASIS cites the UK and Australia as two of the leaders in this area:

"Transformational Government…. encompasses a new "virtual" business layer within government which allows an integrated, government-wide, citizen-focused service to be presented to citizens across all channels, but at no extra cost and without having to restructure government to do so. Two good examples of this new approach are South Australia's "Ask Just Once" portal and the UK Government's DirectGov portal, and the approach is explained in detail in the CS Transform's white paper entitled "Citizen Service Transformation – a manifesto for change in the delivery of public services".

== UN e-Government Development Index ==
EGDI levels by country in 2020

The Division of a Public Administration and Development Management (DPAPM) of the United Nations Department of Economic and Social Affairs (UN-DESA) conducts a biannual e-government survey which includes a section titled e-Government Development Index (EGDI). It is a comparative ranking of 193 countries of the world according to three primary indicators: i) the OSI – Online Service Index that measures the online presence of the government in terms of service delivery; ii) the TII – Telecommunication Infrastructure Index; and iii) HCI – Human Capital Index. Constructing a model for the measurement of digitized services, the survey assesses the 193 member states of the UN according to a quantitative composite index of e-government readiness based on website assessment, telecommunication infrastructure, and human resource endowment. The e-Government Development Index can serve as a benchmarking tool for countries to identify their strengths and weaknesses and shape their policies along these findings in the area of e-government.

The e-Government Development Index (EGDI) is calculated with the following method: EGDI = 1/3 (OSI normalized + TII normalized + HCI normalized).

A diverse group of 100 researchers online volunteers from across the globe engaged with the United Nations Department of Economic Affairs (UN DESA) to process 386 research surveys carried out across 193 UN Member States for the 2016 UN e-Government Survey. The diversity of nationalities and languages of the online volunteers—more than 65 languages, 15 nationalities, of which half are from developing countries—mirrors perfectly the mission of the survey.

The survey has been criticized not including an index of digital inclusion levels.

== Delivery models and activities of e-government ==
The primary delivery models of e-government can be divided into

- Government-to-citizen or government-to-consumer (G2C) approaches such as setting up websites where citizens can download forms, government information, etc.
  - In this model, the G2C model applies the strategy of customer relationship management (CRM) with business concept.
  - By managing their "customer" (citizen) relationship, the business (government) can provide the products and services required to fulfill the needs of the customer (citizen).
  - In United States, the NPR (National Partnership for Reinventing Government) has been implemented from 1993.
- Government-to-business (G2B)
- Government-to-government (G2G)
- Government-to-employees (G2E)

Within each of these interaction domains, four kinds of activities take place:

- pushing information over the Internet, e.g.: regulatory services, general holidays, public hearing schedules, issue briefs, notifications, etc.
- two-way communications between the agency and the citizen, a business, or another government agency. In this model, users can engage in dialogue with agencies and post problems, comments, or requests to the agency.
- conducting transactions, e.g.: lodging tax returns, applying for services and grants.
- governance, e.g.: To enable the citizen transition from passive information access to active citizen participation by
1. Informing the citizen
2. Representing the citizen
3. Encouraging the citizen to vote
4. Consulting the citizen
5. Involving the citizen

Examples of online transactional services, employed in e-governments include

- Applying for a birth certificate
- Applying for a building permit
- Applying for a business license
- Applying for a death certificate
- Applying for a driver's license
- Applying for environmental permits
- Applying for government vacancies online
- Applying for land title registration
- Applying for a marriage certificate
- Applying for a personal identity card
- Applying for social protection programs
- Applying for a visa
- Declaring to police
- Paying fines
- Paying for utilities (water, gas electricity)
- Registering a business
- Registering a motor vehicle
- Looking up land registration info
- Looking up address and telephone number info in online telephone directory
- Submitting a change of address
- Submitting income taxes
- Submitting Value Added Tax

== Controversies ==
=== Disadvantages ===
The main disadvantages concerning e-government are that there exists a digital divide and digital inequalities that bar certain people from accessing the full benefits of digitization. When presented as the only option to access an essential service, those who do not have public access to computers and the Internet, or do not have adequate knowledge on how to use them, suffer.

Other disadvantages include the reliability of information on the Web and issues that could influence and bias public opinions. There are many considerations and potential implications of implementing and designing e-government, including disintermediation of the government and its citizens, digital self-determination of citizens in a global Internet network, impacts on economic, social, and political factors, vulnerability to cyberattacks, and disturbances to the status quo in these areas.

The political nature of public sector forms are also cited as disadvantages to e-government systems.

==== Cost ====
Although "a prodigious amount of money has been spent" on the development and implementation of e-government, some say it has yielded only a mediocre result. The outcomes and effects of trial Internet-based government services are often difficult to gauge or users find them unsatisfactory. According to Gartner, worldwide IT spending is estimated to total $3.6 trillion in 2011, which is 5.1% increase from the year 2010 ($3.4 trillion).

==== Development ====
Because e-government is in the early stages of development in many countries and jurisdictions, it is hard to be applied to forms of government that have been institutionalized. Age-old bureaucratic practices being delivered in new mediums or using new technologies can lead to problems of miscommunication.

An example of such a practice was the automation of the Indiana welfare program that began in 2006. An audit commissioned by then Indiana Governor Mitch Daniels in 2005 found that several Family and Social Service Administration (FSSA) employees and welfare recipients were committing welfare fraud. The bureaucratic nature of Indiana's welfare system allowed people to cheat the system and cost the state large amounts of money. Daniels characterized the system as "irretrievably broken," stating that it was at a state where employees could not fix it on their own. He cited many issues that directly tie into the fact that the system had not been automated.

In hopes to reap the many benefits of e-government, Daniels signed into law a bill privatizing and automating the enrollment service for Indiana's welfare programs. Daniels aimed to streamline benefits applications, privatize casework, and identify fraud. It was believed that moving away from face-to-face casework and toward electronic communication would fix the aforementioned problems and improve efficiency.

Indiana's welfare enrollment facilities were replaced with online applications and call centers operated by IBM. These ran into issues almost immediately. The mainly face-to-face and personalized practice was modernized essentially overnight, blindsiding many people who relied on those features. The automated system worked upon a one-size-fits-all approach that attributed errors to the recipient over anything else. Problems that were previously solvable through a single phone call with a recipient's caseworker became increasingly complicated due to the private call center workers not being adequately trained.

Welfare recipients were denied their benefits due to lack of direct help, system errors out of their control, or simply an inability to use the technology meant to speed up the process. The transition overwhelmed not only recipients but also the employees. In October 2009, even Daniels admitted to the project being flawed and problematic, cancelling the contract with IBM. Indiana began rolling out a hybrid system starting in 2010, including caseworkers and some automation where appropriate.

==== False sense of transparency and accountability ====
Opponents of e-government argue that online governmental transparency is dubious because it is maintained by the governments themselves. Information can be added or removed from the public eye. To this day, very few organizations monitor and provide accountability for these modifications. Those that do so, like the United States' OMBWatch and Government Accountability Project, are often nonprofit volunteers. Even the governments themselves do not always keep track of the information they insert and delete.

==== Hyper-surveillance ====
Increased electronic contact and data exchange between government and its citizens goes both ways. Once e-government technologies become more sophisticated, citizens will be likely be encouraged to interact electronically with the government for more transactions, as e-services are much less costly than brick-and-mortar service offices (physical buildings) staffed by civil servants. This could potentially lead to a decrease in privacy for civilians as the government obtains more and more information about their activities. Without safeguards, government agencies might share information on citizens. In a worst-case scenario, with so much information being passed electronically between government and civilians, a totalitarian-like system could develop. When the government has easy access to countless information on its citizens, personal privacy is lost.

==== Inaccessibility ====
An e-government website that provides government services often does not offer the "potential to reach many users including those who live in remote areas [without Internet access], are homebound, have low literacy levels, exist on poverty line incomes." Homeless people, people in poverty and elderly people may not have access.

==== Trust ====
Trust in e-governance is very highly dependent on its performance and execution, which can be measured through the effectiveness of current actions. This is much riskier and prone to fluctuation than a system of trust that is based on reputation because performance does not consider past actions.

With the automation of institutionalized government services, trust can go both ways: the trust that people have for the government, and the trust the government places in its people. In the case of Indiana's automated welfare system, the less skilled call center workers defaulted their decisions to the automated system and favored solutions that best fit the system rather than the people. When too much trust is put in e-governance, errors and mistakes are not caught.

A crucial part of the Indiana welfare system was the relationship between caseworkers and their clients. It was the main way for Hoosiers to interact with this public institution and receive the help they want. However, Daniels and many others saw a potential invitation to fraud. There were indeed instances of welfare fraud occurring between caseworkers and clients, such as this case from Marion County, December 2009. But the motivation to automate was an attempt to catch people taking advantage of the system rather than trying to deliver the services to as many people as possible. Welfare recipients were being considered as criminals rather than people in need. Such treatment of the poor is similar to that of poorhouses from the 19th and 20th centuries. Both developed flawed systems with an intent to punish, creating more burdens than the initially marketed benefits.

=== Advantages ===
The ultimate goal of the e-government is to be able to offer an increased portfolio of public services to citizens in an efficient and cost-effective manner. E-government allows for government transparency. Government transparency is important because it allows the public to be informed about what the government is working on as well as the policies they are trying to implement.

Simple tasks may be easier to perform through electronic government access. Many changes, such as marital status or address changes, can be a long process and take a lot of paperwork for citizens. E-government allows these tasks to be performed efficiently with more convenience to individuals.

E-government is an easy way for the public to be more involved in political campaigns. It could increase voter awareness, which could lead to an increase in citizen participation in elections.

Supporters argue that e-government is convenient and cost-effective for businesses, and that the public benefits by obtaining easier access to the most current information available while spending less time, energy and money to obtain it.

E-government helps simplify processes and makes government information more easily accessible for public sector agencies and citizens. For example, the Indiana Bureau of Motor Vehicles simplified the process of certifying driver records to be admitted in county court proceedings. Indiana became the first state to allow government records to be digitally signed, legally certified and delivered electronically by using Electronic Postmark technology. In addition to its simplicity, e-democracy services can reduce costs. Alabama Department of Conservation & Natural Resources, Wal-Mart and NIC developed an online hunting and fishing license service utilizing an existing computer to automate the licensing process. More than 140,000 licenses were purchased at Wal-Mart stores during the first hunting season and the agency estimates it will save $200,000 annually from service.

The anticipated benefits of e-government include efficiency, improved services, better accessibility of public services, sustainable community development and more transparency and accountability.

==== Democratization ====
One goal of some e-government initiatives is greater citizen participation. Through the Internet's Web 2.0 interactive features, people from all over the country can provide input to politicians or public servants and make their voices heard. Blogging and interactive surveys allow politicians or public servants to see the views of the people on any issue. Chat rooms can place citizens in real-time contact with elected officials or their office staff or provide them with the means to interact directly with public servants, allowing voters to have a direct impact and influence in their government. These technologies can create a more transparent government, allowing voters to immediately see how and why their representatives in the capital are voting the way they are. This helps voters decide whom to vote for in the future or how to help the public servants become more productive.

A government could theoretically move more towards a true democracy with the proper application of e-government. Government transparency will give insight to the public on how decisions are made and hold elected officials or public servants accountable for their actions. The public could become a direct and prominent influence in government legislature to some degree.

==== Environmental bonuses ====
Proponents of e-government argue that online government services would lessen the need for hard copy paper forms. Due to recent pressures from environmentalist groups, the media, and the public, some governments and organizations have turned to the Internet to reduce paper use. The United States government utilizes the website Government Forms, by Agency | A | USAGov to provide "internal government forms for federal employees" and thus "produce significant savings in paper. As well, if citizens can apply for government services or permits online, they may not need to drive into a government office, which could lead to less air pollution from gas- and diesel-fueled vehicles.

==== Speed, efficiency, and convenience ====
E-government allows citizens to interact with computers to achieve objectives at any time and any location and eliminates the necessity for physical travel to government agents sitting behind desks and windows. Many e-government services are available to citizens with computers and Internet access 24 hours a day and seven days a week, in contrast to brick-and-mortar government offices, which tend to be only open during business hours (notable exceptions are police stations and hospitals, which are usually open 24 hours a day so that staff can deal with emergencies). Organizations like GovTools focus on speed, efficiency and convenience by providing e-government services designed to improve city communications, constituent relationship management (CRM) for political teams and municipalities, civic event coordination, engagement tools, customizable news feeds, and case management systems. The platform incorporates artificial intelligence to enhance operational efficiency and user experience.

Improved accounting and recordkeeping can be noted through computerization, and information and forms can be easily accessed by citizens with computers and Internet access, which may enable quicker processing time for applications and find information. On the administrative side, access to help find or retrieve files and linked information can now be stored in electronic databases versus hard copies (paper copies) stored in various locations. Individuals with disabilities or conditions that affect their mobility no longer have to be mobile to be active in government and can access public services in the comfort of their own homes (as long as they have a computer and Internet and any accessibility equipment they may need).

==== Public approval ====
Recent trials of e-government have been met with acceptance and eagerness from the public. Citizens participate in online discussions of political issues with increasing frequency, and young people, who traditionally display minimal interest in government affairs, are drawn to electronic voting procedures.

Although Internet-based governmental programs have been criticized for lack of reliable privacy policies, studies have shown that people value prosecution of offenders over personal confidentiality. Ninety percent of United States adults approve of Internet tracking systems of criminals, and 57% are willing to forgo some of their personal Internet privacy if it leads to the prosecution of criminals or terrorists.

== Technology-specific e-government ==
There are also some technology-specific sub-categories of e-government, such as m-government (mobile government), u-government (ubiquitous government), and g-government (GIS/GPS applications for e-government).

The previous concern about developments in e-government concerning technology are due to the limited use of online platforms for political reasons by citizens in local political participations.

The primary delivery models of e-government are classified depending on who benefits. In the development of the public sector or private sector portals and platforms, a system is created that benefits all constituents. Citizens needing to renew their vehicle registration have a convenient way to accomplish it while already engaged in meeting the regulatory inspection requirement. On behalf of a government partner, the business provides what has traditionally, and solely, managed by the government and can use this service to generate profit or attract new customers. Government agencies are relieved of the cost and complexity of having to process the transactions.

To develop these public sector portals or platforms, governments have the choice to internally develop and manage, outsource, or sign a self-funding contract. The self-funding model creates portals that pay for themselves through convenience fees for certain e-government transactions, known as self-funding portals.

=== Social media usage ===
Social networking services and websites are an emerging area for e-democracy. The social networking entry point is within the citizens' environment and the engagement is on the citizens' terms. Proponents of e-government perceive the government's use of social networking as a medium to help the government act more like the public it serves. Examples can be found at almost every state government portal through Facebook, Twitter, and YouTube widgets.

Government and its agents also have the opportunity to follow citizens to monitor satisfaction with services they receive. Through ListServs, RSS feeds, mobile messaging, microblogging services and blogs, government and its agencies can share information to citizens who share common interests and concerns. Government is also beginning to employ the use of Twitter. In the state of Rhode Island, Treasurer Frank T. Caprio is offering daily tweets of the state's cash flow. For a full list of state agencies with Twitter feeds, visit NIC. For more information, visit transparent-gov.com.

=== E-signature ===
Several local governments in the United States have allowed online e-signatures for candidate nominating petitions and signature requirements for ballot initiatives. In 2012, Arizona launched a prototype system called E-qual, which allowed statewide candidates running for office to collect signatures online and share the link on other forms on social media. E-qual was expanded in 2016 to cover candidates in local elections within the state, but it was not used at the local level before the 2020 state election. The city of Boulder, Colorado, has implemented a similar system in 2020 to collect signatures for city ballot questions.

== By country ==
=== Africa ===
==== Egypt ====
Since the election of the current president Abdel-Fattah El-Sisi, he has invested large sums of money towards sustainable energy and digitalization of the government system. Some of the problems faced are privacy, security concerns, lack of citizens' awareness, and lack of technical unified standards. Egypt has a population of approximately 100 million with various backgrounds and living conditions and access to resources. Not only does the education level of citizens vary between cities and rural areas but also within Cairo. Compared to other Arab or Middle Eastern countries, Egypt is quite behind in terms of technological developments and utilization. Recently, the government issued a law that all businesses must have electronic receipts and that all pension payments or government-citizen expenditure must be done through electronic transfers. This shows their initiative to leave behind the cash-driven economy to an electronic one.

==== Kenya ====
Following the transition from the longstanding Kenya African National Union government to the National Rainbow Coalition government in December 2002, a Directorate of e-government was established after an executive (cabinet) session in January 2004. The newly created department had the duty to draw the plan of action for future ICT implementations.

Like many other African nations, Kenya has embraced the high mobile penetration rate within its population. Even people living in remote areas that did not have access to traditional telecommunications' networks can now communicate with ease. The fact of the same has, and continues to have, a great impact on the governments' strategies in reaching out to its citizens. Given that about 70% of the population owns mobile phones, leading mobile network operators like Safaricom have taken a great step in offering services that meet citizens' demands. Such services include Kipokezi (which allows subscribers to do online chatting and also exchange electronic mails via standard mobile phones), and M-Pesa (which allows the subscribers to send and receive electronic cash). Such services have even appealed to the majority of Kenyans, as they support the branchless members of the society too, in undertaking normal and secure businesses via M-Pesa. The recent IMF report reveals that MPESA transactions in Kenya exceeded those carried out by the Western Union worldwide.

=== Asia ===
==== Armenia ====
Armenian e-government was established in 2004. E-government brings together all tools and databases created by Armenian state agencies and provides a user-friendly online environment for users. It includes more than twenty services and tools. Under this initiative, "Interactive Budget" and "State Non-Commercial Organisations' Financing" sections are available for the first time. There are also twenty other tools, including search engines, allowing to find the Government's and the Prime Minister's decisions, the agenda of the next cabinet sitting, information on the state purchases, the electronic tax reporting system, the online application system of the Intellectual Property Agency, the information search system of the Intellectual Property Agency, as well as the Electronic Signature and Electronic Visa (e-visa) sections. It is worth mentioning that the Electronic Signature is used in several other services when a user wants to submit an application or receive information. The Electronic Signature is universal system and is used both by the state officials and by citizens, legal entities.

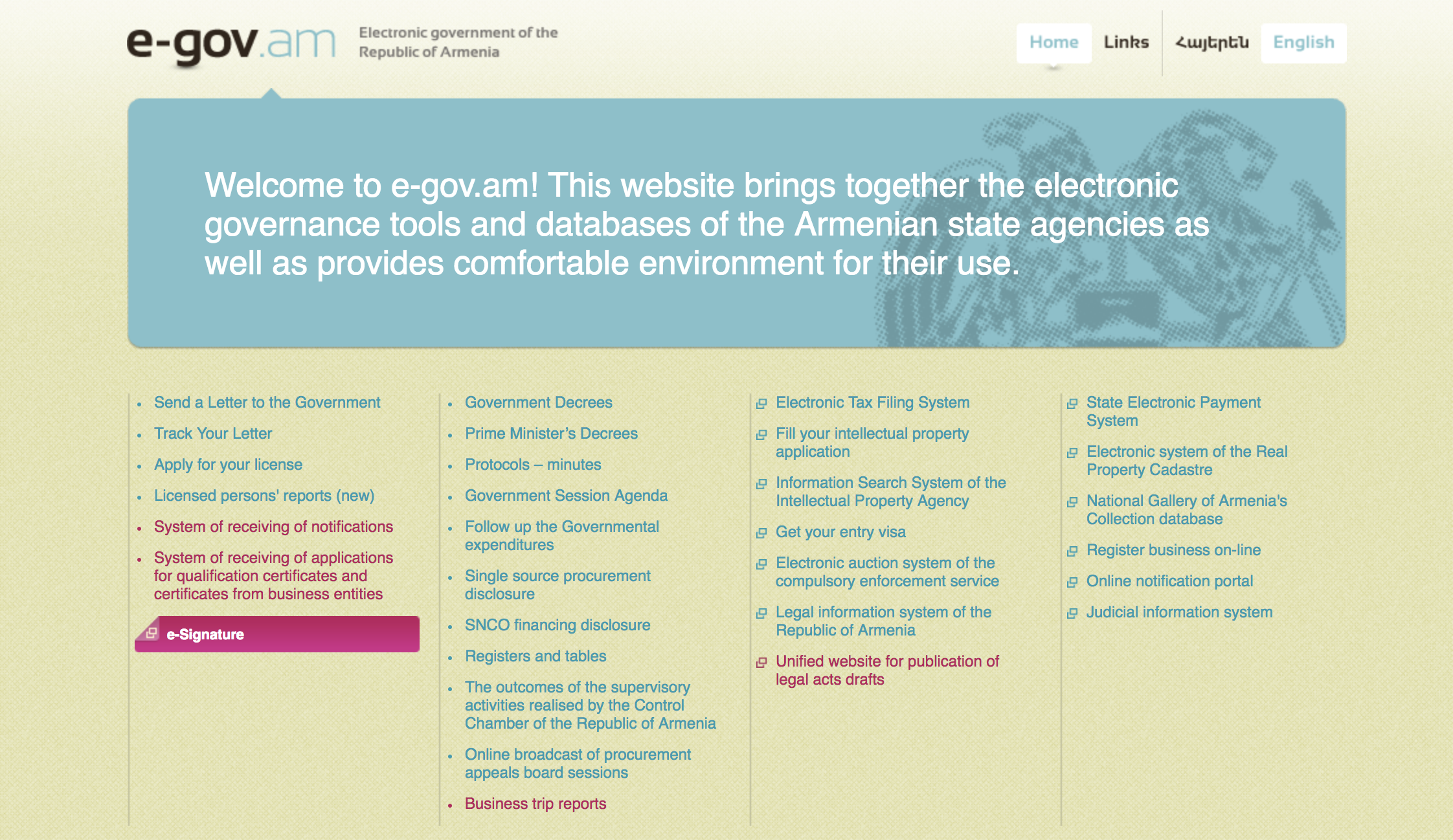
E-government encompasses more than twenty tools and databases providing public services.

1. E-License: This system allows companies to submit an application for obtaining or terminating licenses regarding various activities (pharmaceuticals, banking, construction, transport etc.) It also provides other services in respect of already obtained license.
2. System of reports on licensed activities: The Report Acceptance System for licensed persons enables to submit any report (annually, monthly or quarterly) on licensed activities.
3. E-Payments: Electronic Payment System effectively processes online payments. This application is designed specifically for charging the state fees, local fees, the administrative penalties or services provided by state and local governmental bodies. Payments can be made by Visa, Mastercard, PayPal and local Arca or Mobidram systems.
4. E-Cadastre: The system enables to submit an application to the property cadastre and receives information on landowners, the surface of a plot of land, legal status of any property. The state electronic payment system is integrated into this tool. Online applications for registration of rights and restrictions and related documents may be submitted by users who have a digital signature.
5. E-Draft: In 2016, the Ministry of Justice of Armenia developed Legal Drafts' Database. It is designed particularly for publication any draft initiated by the government or member of Parliament. The database can be accessed through a website, which provides the possibility of presenting the legal acts' drafts to the public, organizing online discussions, and as a consequence, the active participation of representatives of civil society in the lawmaking process. The website enables them to search legal drafts, follow their further progress, and become familiar with the presented suggestions. The registered users can present suggestions, become informed with the "summary paper" of the suggestions to the draft, the adopted suggestions or the reasoning concerning the not adopted ones.
6. E-Register: The system enables registration of legal entities, such as limited liability companies, joint-stock companies, foundations, and self-employed entrepreneurs. On average, it takes twenty minutes to register a company depending on the entity's type. State fees can be paid through E-Payments system. The system also allows users to track the submitted applications and search existing companies as well as purchase full information about any company, including information about shareholders.
7. Datalex: This system allows users to find cases, search for laws of Armenia, as well as to follow the schedule of court hearings.
8. E-Announcement: The system is designed for public announcements. The state authorities are obliged to make public announcements under certain circumstances stipulated by law.
9. E-Tax: This tool simplifies the tax declaration process for both taxpayers and tax authorities. Any natural person or legal entity can submit tax declaration verifying it by electronic signature.
10. E-IP: Online submission of patent and trademark applications using electronic signature.
11. E-Visa This application enables the process of obtaining a visa through an electronic application. Visas are issued within two days.
12. E-Signature: The system allows users to verify the identity of the user and protect the submitted application. Any resident of Armenia, either a natural person or legal entity, can obtain an electronic signature and use it while applying e-government systems.

==== Azerbaijan ====
The "e-government" framework was established in accordance with the "National Strategy on Information-Communication Technologies in the Development of the Republic of Azerbaijan (2003–2012)" and implemented in the framework of the "E-Azerbaijan" Program. The project is aimed to increase the convenience and efficiency of the activity of state agencies, simplify interactions between population, businesses, and government agencies, contribute to creating new citizen-official relations framework and ensure transparency and free flow of information.

The main components of the e-government infrastructure are integrated network infrastructure for state bodies, e-government portal, e-government gateway, State register of information resources and systems, e-signature, e-document circulation and e-government data center (under preparation).

State portal www.e-gov.az was established to facilitate citizens in benefiting from e-services provided by government agencies on a "single-window" principle with the combination of services. Through e-government portal, citizens can use more than 140 e-services of 27 state agencies. Besides, a gateway between government agencies was established to ensure the mutual exchange of information, and most state agencies are connected to this infrastructure. The gateway allows users to efficiently use the existing government information systems and safe contact between them, issuing requests and rendering e-services, liberates citizens from providing same information or documents which are already available in information databases.

On 14 March 2018, it launched the E-government Development Center. It is a public legal entity that is subordinated to State Agency for Public Service and Social Innovations under the president of the Republic of Azerbaijan. The service tries to utilize digital technologies, establish e-government to make state services operate more efficiently, ensure public services availability, and improve the living standards of the citizens of the country. It is a government-to-citizen type of e-governance.

==== Bangladesh ====
An e-government web portal was developed to provide access to various government services and information through one service.

==== China ====
According to State-owned Assets Supervision and Administration Commission of the State Council (国务院国有资产监督管理委员会) of Fujian Province, digital Transformation was firstly proposed by IBM in 2012, which enhances the application of digital technology to reshape customer value propositions and emphasizes the customer interaction and collaboration.

The Chinese government has added "Digital Economy" to its "Government Work Report" (政府工作报告) for four consecutive years from 2017, and proposed in the 14th Five-Year Plan to outline the "Use digital transformation to drive changes in production methods, lifestyles and governance methods as a whole".

Furthermore, digital transformation has been elevated to a national strategy from enterprise (organization) level.

The Chinese government's official website for e-government is eGovernment.gov.cn, maintained by Central Party School of the Chinese Communist Party (中共中央党校) or National Academy of Governance (国家行政学院; these are different names for one institute).

==== Hong Kong ====
Ever since the sovereign handover in 1997, Hong Kong has been improving in technology and e-governance.

==== India ====
The E-Governance initiatives and programs in India are undertaken by the Ministry of Electronics and Information Technology (MeitY www.meity.gov.in). The current umbrella program for e-governance of Government of India is known by the title "DIGITAL INDIA" (www.digitalindia.gov.in)

Indian government has launched many e-governance initiatives, including a portal for public grievance, MCA21 Mission Mode Project, e-Filing of income tax, e-gazette, Project Nemmadi, and their overall digital India policy.

==== Indonesia ====
E-government in Indonesia is developing, especially in central and regional/local government offices. E-government was officially introduced to public administration by Presidential Directive No 6/2001 on Telematics, which states that the government of Indonesia has to use telematics technology to support good governance. Furthermore, e-government should have been introduced for different purposes in government offices. As one of the ISO member countries, Indonesia gives more attention to facilitating the activities of standardization. Among of the facilities provided are building the National information system of standardization (SISTANAS) and Indonesia Standardization Information Network (INSTANET). As of 2017, ministries, institutions and local governments of Indonesia used to run separate e-government systems, which is now integrated into a centrally based system. In 2017, the government has also undertaken programs for digitization of SMEs and the informal sector. Many of the cities across Indonesia, including Jakarta, Bandung, Surabaya, and Makassar, are implementing smart city concepts, consisting of e-government, e-health, e-education, e-logistics and e-procurement as priority areas.

==== Iran ====
In 2002, Iran published a detailed report named TAKFA (Barnameye Tose-e va Karborde Fanavaie Etela’at) in which it was predicted that most of the government bodies would try to virtualize their services as soon as possible. However, based on the reports by UN bodies, Iran has failed in recent years to meet the average standards of e-government. In 2008, the Supreme Council of Information released a report which criticized the government for its poor advancement in employing new communication technologies for administration purposes.

In 2016, Iran launched the National Information Network and improved the quality and speed of Internet access. In 2017, Iran introduced phase one of e-government including E-Tax, E-Customs, E-Visa, E-Government Portal, and a mobile application to modernize Iran's government services.

The Iranian government plans to introduce other phases of e-gov soon.

==== Iraq ====
The Iraqi e-government citizen program was established to "eliminate bribery and favoritism and end the citizens' suffering in going back repeatedly to directories". The interface lets the citizen send requests and complaints; it can also be used for issuing identity cards, driving licenses and passports.

==== Jordan ====
Jordan established its e-government program in 2002. Many governmental services are provisioned online.

==== Kazakhstan ====
The e-government portal egov.kz was launched in 2012 as part of Kazakhstan's effort to modernize how citizens access government services and information. It offers all possible services that can be provided by the state for citizens and businesses such as education, health care, social security, job placement and employment, tax issues, legal assistance. It is currently at the transformational stage of development. The main goal of egov.kz is to maximize efficiency. For instance, users can register birth of a child, while simultaneously resolving all related issues—applying for benefits and putting the child on the waiting list for kindergarten.
The egov.kz mobile app was recognized as best app in the GovTechioneers competition at the 2017 World Government Summit in Dubai. At the WSIS Prizes 2017 (World Summit on the Information Society contest), three projects from the Republic of Kazakhstan were announced champions: e-Government, Open Government, and Integrated Call Center 1414.

Projects of the e-government:

- "E-licensing" information system – Created to automate the processes of licensing and permits and to ensure an effective and transparent mechanism for information interaction between government agencies – licensors and the business community of the Republic of Kazakhstan.
- "E-notary" – Developed with the aim to improve the control over the activity of notary officers and optimize their work. The system involves registration of notary activities in electronic register and brings benefit to all the participants of juridical acts. "E-notary" system allows notary officers to check authenticity of the documents, get valid real estate data, maintain records of inheritance cases and goodwill.
- Open Government – The Open Government consists of the following components: Open Data, Open RLA, Open Dialogue, Open Budgets, as well as Assessment of the Effectiveness of Government Agencies.
- eGov Mobile mobile application – Designed to provide public services and e-government services via smartphones. Citizens can log in using digital signature or a one-time password.
- Chatbots at Telegram, Facebook and Vkontakte – Chatbots based on artificial intelligence were created to automate consultation of the most frequently requested public services of the e-government portal.
- Smart Bridge – The project aimed at simplification of organizational procedures for integration, interaction of government bodies with business and the development of a competitive environment.
- Saqbol mobile app – Created to control the spread of coronavirus infection, as well as to timely localize infection sites using the Exposure Notification (notification system on the risk of contagion from Google and Apple). The app is designed to anonymously track contacts with other devices that have the same app installed, and store encrypted records of interaction with them.

==== Malaysia ====
In Malaysia, the e-government efforts are undertaken by the Malaysian government, under the umbrella of Multimedia Super Corridor (MSC) and e-government flagships, which was launched in mid-1996, by Mahathir Mohamad (1981–2003), by the then Prime Minister of Malaysia (Jeong & Nor Fadzlina, 2007).

Electronic government is an initiative aimed at reinventing how the government works. It seeks to improve how the government operates, as well as how it delivers services to the people (Ibrahim Ariff & Goh Chen Chuan, 2000).

==== Myanmar ====
The Yangon City Development Committee (Burmese- ရန်ကုန်မြို့တော်စည်ပင်သာယာရေးကော်မတီ) (YCDC) is the administrative body of Yangon, and Yangon is the largest city and former capital of Myanmar (Burma). The Yangon City Development Committee consists of 20 departments. Its headquarters was on the Yangon City Hall. The committee's chairman is also the city's mayor.

In 2003, YCDC was organized to provide e-government for Yangon City. The main purposes of the city's e-government program are to provide easy access between the government and the city's citizens via the Internet, to reduce paper usage, to reduce the city budget, to build the city's fiber ring, to provide timely public information, to store public data and to develop and expand G2G, G2C, G2B, and G2E programs.

In January 2013, responsibility for e-government was divided between the e-Government Administration Committee and the e-Government Processing Committee. The e-Government Administration Committee includes the Mayor of Yangon City as Chief, the General Secretary of Yangon City as Sub-Chief, and the other 20 head of department officers as chairmen. The e-Government Processing Committee includes the Head of Public Relation and Information Department as Chief and the other 20 deputy head of department officers as chairmen.

The official web-portal is www.ycdc.gov.mm.

Mandalay is the second-largest city and the last royal capital of Myanmar (Burma). In 2014, Mandalay Region Government developed www.mdyregion.gov.mm to know about regional government and their activities to people.

Mandalay Region Government organized the e-Government Steering Committee on 23 June 2016. That committee chairman was U Sai Kyaw Zaw, Minister, Ministry of Ethnic Affairs.

On 21 July 2017, www.emandalay.gov.mm web portal was opened by Dr. Zaw Myint Maung, Prime Minister of Mandalay Region Government. That portal includes 2 e-services, 199 topics from 70 agencies. The committee develops a Regional Data Center, too. That Datacenter will be opened in 2018.

==== Nepal ====
The e-government planning and conceptual framework has been presented to Nepal in extensive support from the Government of Korea (KIPA). E-government Vision is "The Value Networking Nepal" through

- Citizen-centered service
- Transparent service
- Networked government
- Knowledge-based society

Nepal's e-government mission statement is "Improve the quality of people's lives without any discrimination, transcending regional and racial differences, and realize socio-economic development by building a transparent government and providing value-added quality services through ICT."

The e-government practice has been slow both in adoption and practice in Nepal. However, local government bodies now have dedicated team of ICT Volunteers working towards implementing e-government in the country through an extensive ICT for Local Bodies initiatives.

==== Saudi Arabia ====
In 2015, the Ministry of Interior of Saudi Arabia launched the e-service application known as Absher. The application allows the people of the Kingdom to access more than 279 different government services from their smartphones, without the need to queue or for the inefficiencies of bureaucracy.

Some e-services that can be completed by way of the application include

1. Passport Services
2. Traffic Services
3. Expatriate Affairs Services
4. Civil Affairs Services
5. Authorizations
6. General Directorate of Prisons
7. Public Prosecution
8. Public Security
9. MOI Services (Ministry of Interior)
10. Ministry of Hajj
11. General Services
12. Information Services

Another application that has been launched is Tawakkalna. This application was created by the Saudi Data and Artificial Intelligence Authority (SDAIA) in order for the government to better counteract against COVID-19. Initially, the application was created so as to issue permits to those who were required to commute to work during lockdown. Now, it is being used for travel; entering commercial buildings, hospitals, and schools within the Kingdom; setting vaccine appointments; and COVID-19 tracing.

==== South Africa ====
South Africa launched MyMzansi in 2025 as a unified digital public infrastructure (DPI) initiative and single service portal, enabling citizens to access government services through a mobile application or web interface. The initiative seeks to create a more integrated and citizen-centered public administration by providing access to multiple services through a single trusted platform. Its initial implementation phase (2025–2027) focuses on establishing core digital infrastructure, followed by the expansion of digital services across sectors such as health, education and business.

==== South Korea ====
Announced in 2013 with "an ambitious plan to allow wider public access to government data to improve the transparency of state affairs", this initiative includes citizen-centered government innovation, core values of openness, sharing, communication, collaboration for all areas of governing, customized services to individual citizens, which will create jobs and support creative economy.

==== Sri Lanka ====
Sri Lanka have taken some initiative actions to provide the benefits of e-government to the citizens.

==== Thailand ====
To implement the principles of e-government, the Ministry of Information and Telecommunication Technologies of Thailand developed a plan for creating a modern e-services system during 2009–2014.

The next stage was the five-year project of the digital government, which began in 2016 and will be completed in 2021. This project assumes that within five years, more than 80% of Thai government agencies will use electronic documents for identification.

There is the Unified State Portal of e-Government of Thailand, developed by the Ministry of Information and Telecommunications Technology in 2008.

In 2018, Thailand ranks 73rd in the UN e-government ranking.

==== United Arab Emirates ====
In the United Arab Emirates, the Emirates eGovernment is designed for e-government operations.

In 2023, the United Arab Emirates introduced U-Ask, a generative AI-powered chatbot designed to respond to diverse inquiries and requests by providing comprehensive and accurate information on government services and public-sector matters.

==== Pakistan ====
In 2014, the Government of Pakistan created the National Information Technology Board under the Ministry of Information Technology & Telecom to enable a digital eco-system for government services to the citizens of Pakistan. NITB was formed as a result of a merger between Pakistan Computer Bureau (PCB) and Electronic Government Directorate (EGD).

The key functions identified by the NITB are

- Provide technical guidance for the introduction of e-governance in the federal government.
- Suggest the efficient and cost-effective implementation of e-government programs in the federal ministries/divisions.
- To carry out a training needs assessment and design and implement the identified IT capacity-building programs for the employees of federal ministries/divisions.
- Review the status of e-government readiness regularly to ensure sustainable, accelerated digitization and relevant human resource development.
- Identify the areas where IT interventions can be helpful and to suggest measures for the automation of these areas through Business Process Re-engineering (BPR).

NITB rolled out an e-Office Suite across various ministries in the Government of Pakistan. While it clearly pursued efficiency gains and improved transparency, it also hoped to deliver "efficient and cost-effective public services to citizens of Pakistan." The suite primarily included five modules or applications across all the ministries. Description of each module listed are

- Internal Communication Module
- HR Management Module
- Inventory & Procurement Management Module
- Project Management Module
- Finance Budget Module

NITB released a high-level diagram that describes the process of transforming federal government agencies and ministries to e-office environments.

Criticism: NITB's rollout of the e-Office suite across almost all federal agencies is not only overly ambitious but also likely to fail. It seems to put together a lot of lofty organizational efficiency goals with a set of delivery or citizen-facing targets. In fact, most of the services NITB has provided have been largely conceptual and not sufficient concrete. The process outlined in the adoption process diagram seems devoid of any user-centric design or value proposition formulation. Instead of creating many MVPs (Minimum Viable Products) and taking advantage of an iterative and validated learning the process, the e-Office Suite seems to incorporate all the features and functions that various ministries and divisions may need or use. It seems to focus more on the needs of the bureaucrats and government agencies rather than the needs of the end-user (citizens of Pakistan) and what services would they need that a ministry or division can provide.

=== Europe ===
==== Estonia ====
Since 1998, Estonia has pursued e-government as a national development strategy through its e-Estonia program. Key initiatives include electronic identification (e-ID), X-Road, which enables secure data exchange between public institutions, e-Tax, online voting (i-Voting), e-Health and e-Residency, which facilitates entrepreneurship among foreign nationals. By 2022, 99% of public services were available online, and Estonia ranked eighth globally in the United Nations E-Government Development Index.

==== Germany ====
E-government (from (en) electronic government, (de) e-government, rarely eGovernment) refers to the simplification, implementation and support of processes for information, communication and transaction within and between state, municipal and other official institutions and between these institutions and citizens or companies and organizations through the use of digital information and communication technologies (ICT).

The legal basis in Germany for federal authorities is the Electronic Government Act (EGovG). Some of the federal states have their own e-government laws.

==== Poland ====
The first discussions in Poland on e-government in Europe began with a report published in 1994 by the European Commission, entitled "Europe and the Global Information Society Recommendations to the Council of Europe" (named after one of the authors of the Bangemann Report). It showed the direction of the development of the global information society in Europe. Since then, the concept of e-government has become a permanent fixture in the issues raised in the EU as a component of eEurope.

In Poland, the year 2000 should be considered the beginning of e-government. It was then that the Scientific Research Committee prepared a document based on seven expert opinions, which was published under the collective title "Global Information Society in the conditions of Poland's Accession to the European Union". Today, we know the material as an official document of the Scientific Research Committee and the Ministry of Communications entitled "Goals and directions of development of the information society in Poland". In 2000, the Sejm also adopted a resolution on building the information society, and then in 2001, passed an act important for the development of e-government: introducing the Public Information Bulletin (BIP), the Act on access to public information, and the act on electronic signature, regulating the issue of e-signature. The next step in the development of e-management was the preparation of the ePoland document, containing an action plan for the development of the information society in Poland, which was modeled on the European eEurope development plan. This document was last updated in 2002. The next version of this strategy was called ePolska-2006. The adoption of this document resulted in the preparation by the Scientific Research Committee of the preliminary concept of the Gateway to Poland project (a central IT system, the task of which was to provide administrative services for citizens and business entities by electronic means) and the document The Strategy for Informatisation of the Republic of Poland-ePoland.

==== Russia ====
On the Federal Law "On providing state and municipal services" (2010), the strategy on development of Information Society in the Russian Federation, approved by the President (2008), the Federal target programme "Electronic Russia" (2002–2010), approved by the government (2002), the State Programme "Information Society" (2010), the Procedure on development and approval of administrative regulations execution of public functions (public services), approved by the government (2005), the concept of administrative reform in the Russian Federation in 2006 and 2010 respectively, approved by the government (2005), on other orders, resolutions and acts in the Russian Federation was created electronic government (or e-government).

The main target on creating e-government lies in the field of providing equal opportunities for all the Russians in spite of their living place and their incomes and make a more effective system of public administration. So e-government is created for reaching the useful system of public management accommodating the individual interests of every citizen by participation through ICTs in public policymaking.

Nowadays, Russian e-government includes such systems as

1. The united interagency interacting system using for providing of state and municipal services, exchange of information and data between participants of interagency interacting, quick approval of state and municipal decisions, etc.
2. The united system for authentication and authorization providing evidence of the rights of all participants of e-government.
3. The united portal of state and municipal services and functions which are the "single window" for all information and services assured by government and municipals.

The portal of public services is one of the key elements of the project to create an "electronic government" in the country. The portal provides a single point of access to all references on state and municipal services through the Internet and provides citizens and organizations the opportunity to receive these services electronically. Monthly visits by users of the public services portal range between 200,000 and 700,000. For example, citizens are now able to obtain or exchange a driver's license through this portal.

4. Head system providing utilization of electronic signature.

Other systems located on cloud services, since cloud computing has been a useful tool for e-government according to researchers.

Today, Russian e-government elements are demanded in the spheres of e-governance, e-services (e-health, e-education, e-library, etc.), e-commerce, e-democracy (web-election, Russian public initiative). By the United Nations E-Government Survey 2012, e-Government for the People Russia became one of the 7 emerging leaders in e-government development, took ninth place in rating of e-government development in largest population countries, and took 8th rank in top e-participation leaders, after Norway, Sweden and Chile, Advancing 32 positions in the world rankings, the Russian Federation became the leader of e-government in Eastern Europe. Evolution of ICT in the Russian Federation provided the raising of Russia in e-government development index to the 27 places.

==== Spain ====
According to OECD Digital Government Index, in 2025, Spain attained a score of 0.75, above the OECD average of 0.70. The report pointed out initiatives that have contributed to this outcome such as the Public Administration Digitalization Plan 2021-2025, coordinated by the State Agency for Digital Administration (AEAD), and a digital skills training programme for the public sector managed by the National Institute of Public Administration (INAP).

==== Turkey ====
E-government in Turkey is the use of digital technology to improve service efficiency and effectiveness in Turkey.

As of December 2020, 700 government agencies offers 5,338 applications to 51,757,237 million users. The mobile application offers 2,850 services.

==== Ukraine ====
The main coordinating government body in matters of e-government is Ministry of Digital Transformation established in 2019. In 2020, it launched the Diia app and web portal which allows Ukrainians to use various kinds of documents (including ID cards and passports) via their smartphones as well as to access various government services with the plans to make all governmental services available by 2023.

==== United Kingdom ====
Transformational Government: Enabled by Technology, 2005, stated that "the future of public services has to use technology to give citizens choice, with personalised services designed around their needs not the needs of the provider".

A major report published by the House of Commons Public Administration Select Committee in July 2011 addressed procurement of Information Technology by the government and found there was an overreliance "on a small 'oligopoly' of large suppliers". The report introduced its summary with the observation that

[D]espite a number of successful initiatives, government's overall record in developing and implementing new IT systems is appalling.

However, an initiative introduced in 2011 which enables people to notify a number of central and local government departments about a birth or death at the same time, called "Tell Us Once", has been welcomed as "a fine example of innovation and best practice, a dynamic and inspiring model".

=== North America ===
==== Canada ====
The current Clerk of the Privy Council – the head of the federal public service has made workplace renewal a pillar of overall public service renewal. The key to workplace renewal is the adoption of collaborative networked tools. An example of such a tool is GCPEDIA – a wiki platform for federal public servants. Other tools include GCconnex, a social networking tool, and GCforums, a discussion board system.

Report of the Auditor General of Canada: Chapter 1 Information Technology: Government On-Line 2003: "One of the key principles of Government On-Line is that programs and services will be transformed to reflect the needs and expectations of clients and citizens. From the government's perspective, the overall objective of the GOL initiative is full service transformation – to fundamentally change the way the government operates and to deliver better services to Canadians."

==== United States ====
The election of Barack Obama as President of the United States became associated with the effective use of Internet technologies during his campaign and in the implementation of his new administration in 2009. On January 21, 2009, the president signed one of his first memorandums – the Memorandum for the Heads of Executive Departments and Agencies on Transparency and Open Government. The memo called for an unprecedented level of openness in government, asking agencies to "ensure the public trust and establish a system of transparency, public participation, and collaboration." The memo further "directs the Chief Technology Officer, in coordination with the Director of the Office of Management and Budget (OMB) and the Administrator of General Services (GSA), to coordinate the development by appropriate executive departments and agencies [and] to take specific actions implementing the principles set forth in the memorandum."

President Obama's memorandum centered around the idea of increasing transparency throughout various different federal departments and agencies. By enabling public websites like recovery.gov and data.gov to distribute more information to the American population, the administration believes that it will gain greater citizen participation.

In 2009, the U.S. federal government launched Data.gov to make more government data available to the public. With data from Data.Gov, the public can build apps, websites, and mashups. Although "Gov 2.0", as a concept and as a term, had been in existence since the mid-2000s, it was the launch of Data.gov that made it "go viral".

In August 2009, the City of San Francisco launched DataSF.org with more than a hundred datasets. Just weeks after the DataSF.org launch, new apps and websites were developed. Using data feeds available on DataSF.org, civic-minded developers built programs to display public transportation arrival and departure times, where to recycle hazardous materials, and crime patterns. Since the launch of DataSF.org, there have been more than seventy apps created with San Francisco's data.

In March 2009, former San Francisco Mayor Gavin Newsom was at Twitter headquarters for a conversation about technology in government. During the town hall, Newsom received a tweet about a pothole. He turned to Twitter co-founders Biz Stone and Evan Williams and said, "Let's find a way for people to tweet their service requests directly to San Francisco's 311 customer service center." Three months later, San Francisco launched the first Twitter 311 service, called @SF311, allowing residents to tweet, text, and send photos of potholes and other requests directly to the city. Working with Twitter and using the open-source platform, CoTweet turned @SF311 into reality. The software procurement process for something like this would normally have taken months, but in this case, it took less than three months. The @SF311 is saving the city money in call center costs. In 2011, The United States Government Accountability Office passed the Electronic Government Act in 2002 to promote better use of Internet and information technology; and additionally, to improve government services for citizens, internal government operations, and opportunities for citizen participation in government.

Presidential Innovation Fellows program where "teams of government experts and private-sector doers take a user-centric approach to issues at the intersection of people, processes, products, and policy to achieve lasting impact" launched in 2012. 18F, a new digital government delivery service, was formed in early 2014 and the United States Digital Service (USDS) was launched later in 2014.

=== South America ===
==== Brazil ====
The goal defined in the Digital Government Strategy is to reach the total digitization of services by the end of 2022.

"The main objective of the digital government is to bring citizens closer to the State. Technologies allow us to see each Brazilian better, including those who feel excluded, to direct public policies in a much more agile and efficient way and to reach mainly those who need it most", emphasizes the Digital Government secretary of the Ministry of Economy, Luís Felipe Monteiro.

== International initiatives ==
The early pioneering work by some governments is now being picked up by a range of global organizations which offer support to governments in moving to a transformational government approach. For example:

- The World Bank has set up an eTransform Initiative (ETI) with support from global IT partners such as Gemalto, IBM, L-1 Identity Solutions, Microsoft and Pfizer. "The eTransform Initiative is about tapping information technology, expertise and experiences", said Mohsen Khalil, Director of the World Bank Group's Global Information and Communication Technologies Department. "Government transformation is about change management facilitated by technology. This initiative will facilitate the exchange of lessons and experiences among various governments and industry players, to maximize impact and lower risks of ICT-enabled government transformation."
- A number of private sector organizations working in this area have published white papers which pull together global best practices on government transformation.
- OASIS launched (September 2010) a new Technical Committee tasked with producing a new global best practice standard for a transformational government Framework. The Framework is expressed as a number of "Pattern Languages", each providing a detailed set of guidance notes and conformance clauses on how to deliver the required changes in practice.

== See also ==
- AI mayor
- Center for Electronic Governance at UNU-IIST
- Collaborative e-democracy
- Cyberocracy
- Digital 5
- Digital era governance
- Digital Government Society of North America
- Digital integrity
- E-democracy
- E-government factsheets
- E-Government Unit
- E-participation
- E-procurement
- eGovernment in Europe
- Electronic voting
- eRulemaking
- Government by algorithm
- Information society
- International Conference on Theory and Practice of Electronic Governance
- Issue tracking systems in government
- National Center for Digital Governance
- Online consultation
- Online deliberation
- Online petition
- Online volunteering
- Open government
- Open-source governance
- Portal e-Cidadania
- Project Cybersyn
- Teleadministration
