= E-Dirham =

Digital payment system in the United Arab Emirates

e-Dirham is a digital payment service offering mobile wallets in the United Arab Emirates. It was launched by the United Arab Emirates government in 2001 to streamline the collection of service fees. Initially developed for federal use, it has since expanded to local governments and private entities. In 2025 it was given legal status equal to that of physical currency.

== History ==
e-Dirham was introduced by the government of the United Arab Emirates on 3 February 2001 to facilitate the secure collection of fees for governmental and non-governmental services. Initially developed for federal government transactions, it was later adopted by local governments, semi-governmental entities, and private sector organizations. The UAE was the first country in the Arab region to implement such a system nationwide.

The system is managed by the Ministry of Finance and was developed by GET Group. Over time, e-Dirham has expanded to offer a variety of payment channels, including point of sale (POS) terminals, an internet payment gateway, and electronic stamps (e-Stamps).

== Card types ==
Fixed Value Card

The Fixed Value Card functions as a non-rechargeable prepaid card, available in denominations of AED 100, 200, 300, 500, 1000, 3000, and 5000. These cards can be used alone or in combination (up to two cards) to pay for services. They are sold at face value through participating member banks.

Government Client Card

Launched on 24 June 2001, the Government Client Card is a rechargeable, personalized smart card designed for frequent users of government services. Available to both individuals and companies, the card is issued with a PIN and can be loaded with funds at member banks via cash or account transfer. Applications are accepted at Ministry of Finance offices in Abu Dhabi and Dubai, as well as at participating banks. The card enables access to services via an interactive voice response (IVR) system and an online platform, providing 24/7 availability.

== Distribution ==
As of the system's early implementation, e-Dirham cards were distributed through several member banks, including the National Bank of Dubai, Commercial Bank of Dubai, Union National Bank, Mashreq Bank, and Abu Dhabi Islamic Bank. Some banks operated dedicated branches within government ministries to facilitate public access to the service.
