= Absher (application) =

Saudi Arabian government application

- Absher for Individuals
- Developer: Ministry of Interior (Saudi Arabia)
- Release: 2010
- Operating system: Windows, Android, IOS, macOS, Linux
- Type: Governmental services
- Website: absher.sa

Absher (Arabic: أبشر ‘Absher, roughly meaning "good tidings" or "yes, done") is a smartphone application and web portal which allows citizens and residents of Saudi Arabia to use a variety of governmental services. Amongst several other services with the Absher app, it can be used to apply for jobs and Hajj permits, passport info can be updated, and electronic crimes can be reported. The application provides around 280 services for residents of Saudi Arabia including but not limited to making appointments, renewing passports, residents' cards, IDs, driver's licenses and others, and, controversially, enables Saudi men to track the whereabouts of women they control as part of the country's male guardianship system.

The app can be downloaded from the Google Play Store and Apple App Store and is supplied by the Saudi Interior Ministry. According to the Ministry of the Interior, Absher has more than 20 million users. As of February 2019, Absher has been downloaded 4.2 million times from the App Store. Some services provided through Absher can also be accessed through the website absher.sa.

In March 2021, Saudi Arabia launched the digital version of the Absher for individuals app through which the users can download a copy of their digital ID. Then, new services were added to the platform such as online birth and death registration services, requesting amendments to academic credentials, correcting names in English and marital status and requesting civil records of children.

== Impact on women's rights ==
The app has been criticized by various human rights activists, human rights organisations and international communities. The US and European countries have also condemned the app and urged the kingdom to end its male guardianship system. Absher gained media attention in 2019 for its functions supporting the Saudi policy of male guardianship following an investigation by Business Insider. The app allows for designated guardians to receive notifications if a woman under their guardianship passes through an airport and subsequently gives them the option to withdraw her right to travel. In a few cases, this system has been circumvented by women who have been able to gain control over its settings and use it to allow themselves to travel.

US Senator Ron Wyden of Oregon wrote a letter to the CEO's of Apple and Google, criticizing the app and demanding for its removal immediately. Wyden said "American companies should not enable or facilitate the Saudi government's patriarchy," and called the Saudi system of control over women "abhorrent". According to the EU lawmakers, current rules imposed over the women by the Saudi government make women “second-class citizens”. The lawmakers also asked the EU states to continue to build pressure on Riyadh so as to improve the conditions of women and human rights. Amnesty International and Human Rights Watch accused Apple and Google of helping "enforce gender apartheid" by hosting the app. US congresswomen Rep. Katherine Clark and Rep. Carolyn B. Maloney condemned the kingdom's male guardianship system that reflected from the app, calling Absher a "patriarchal weapon" and asking for its removal.

In response to the criticism received by Absher, Apple chief executive officer Tim Cook stated in February 2019 that he intended to investigate the situation. Similarly, Google announced that it would also review the application. After a prompt review, Google declined to remove the app from Google Play, citing that it did not violate the agreed upon terms and conditions of the store.

Saudi doctor Khawla Al-Kuraya supported this app an editorial in Bloomberg News. Kuraya wrote that Absher helped Saudi women avoid governmental bureaucracy as it allows their male guardians to process their travel permits anywhere and anytime through Absher. Although she believes that the guardianship system needs to be reconsidered, she thinks that Absher is an important step towards facilitating women-guardians related issues in Saudi Arabia.

Absher manager Atiyah Al-Anazy announced in 2019 that two million women were using the application in Saudi Arabia to facilitate their transactions. Some female users stated that the application has made their movement and travel-related issues easier.

New measures were introduced that year to allow Saudi women above the age of 18 to travel without their male guardians, which ultimately released male authoritative rights on women. A law was subsequently passed allowing women over the age of 21 to receive a passport and travel without prior male permission.

== See also ==
- Nafath
- Women's rights in Saudi Arabia
