= Elm (company) =

Saudi joint stock company

Elm Company شركة علم
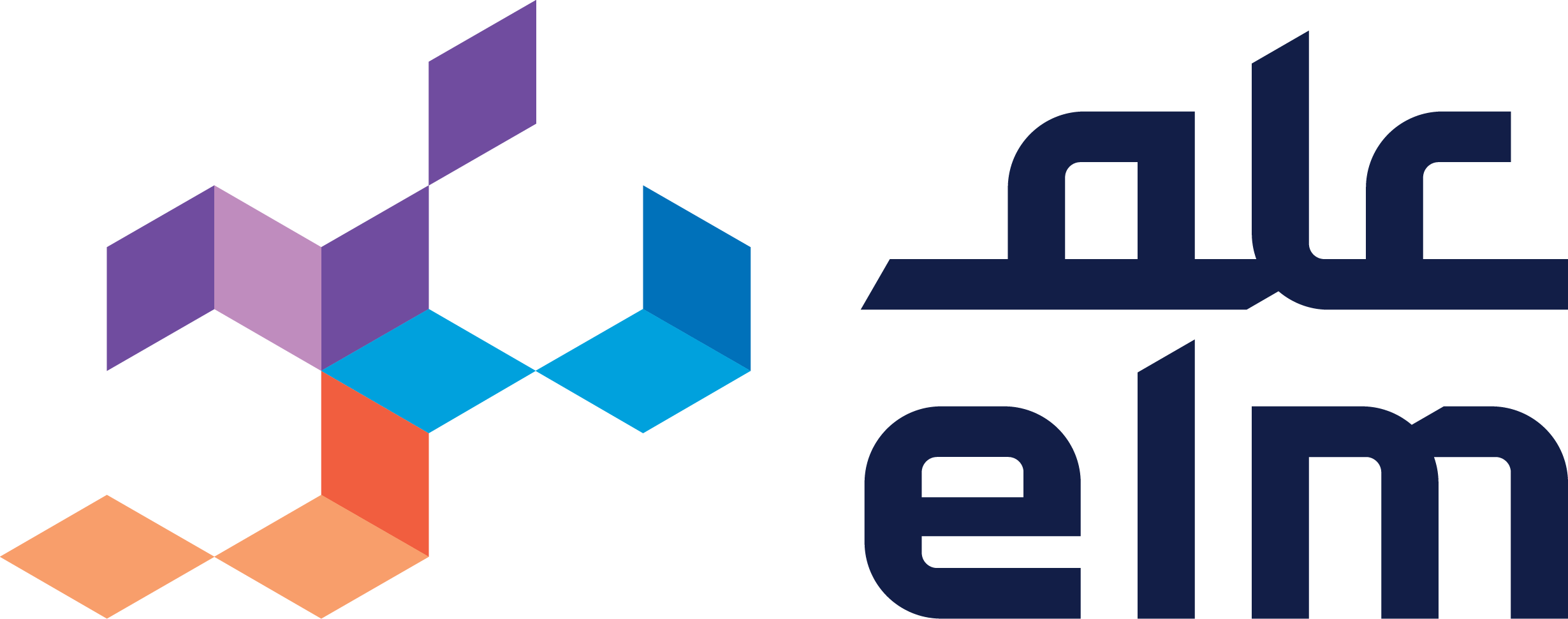
- Type: Joint-stock company
- Industry: Business Solutions
- Founded: 1988; 38 years ago
- Headquarters: Riyadh, Saudi Arabia
- Key people: Mohammed Al omair (CEO)
- Number of employees: 2,500
- Website: www.elm.sa

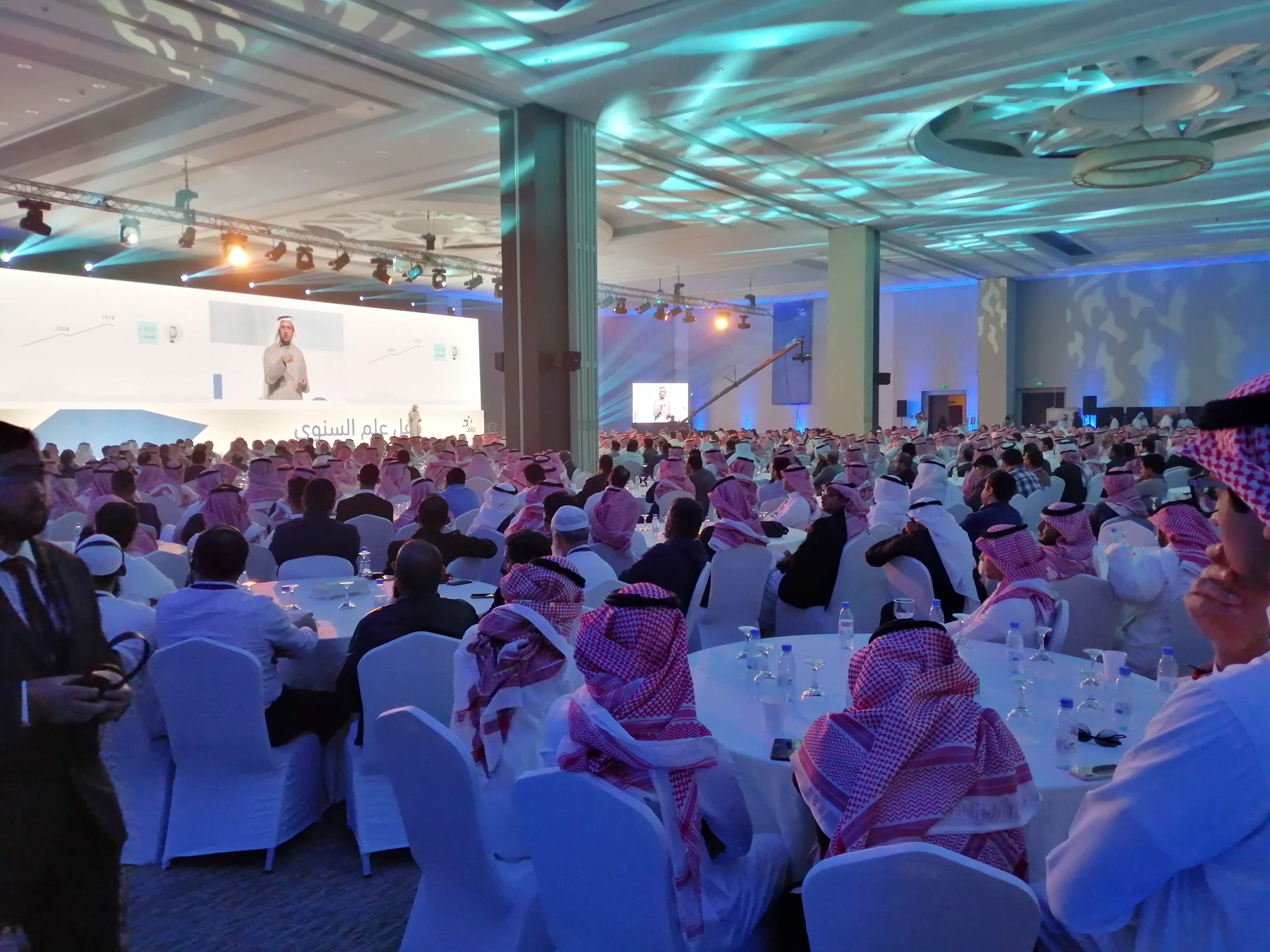
Elm Annual Ceremony 2019

Elm is a Saudi joint-stock company owned by the Public Investment Fund (PIF), which is the investment arm of the Saudi Ministry of Finance. Elm services are provided to all forms of beneficiaries, including government, corporate sector and individuals.

== Sectors ==
Elm services are:

- Ready made solutions
- Customs solutions
- Outsourcing services
- Consulting services

== Elm history ==
- 1988: Elm was established as Al-Elm Research and Development Company. At that time, the company role was to localize and transfer knowledge and information technology to the Kingdom of Saudi Arabia, in addition to some research initiatives benefiting the Ministry of Interior.
- 2002: The Company began its commercial activities and changed its name to Al-Elm Information Security Company. Its services at that time included everything that had to do with information security starting from designing secure structures for companies, to performing penetration testing. The first E-government service started in the following years piloted by the Saudi Omrah Portal.
- 2004:Elm switched its business focus from Information Security to providing Secure e-Services. In the years to come, everyone was talking about e-Government; Elm was already living it. The company continued providing all sorts of different secure e-Services until it managed to produce the Electronic exit/re-entry travel visa for expatriates residing within the country, such an achievement was considered to be the first fully interactive Saudi e-Government service that applies all qualifications of an e-Service.
- 2007: the Ministerial Cabinet approved the decree to transform the company to be owned by the Public Investment Fund and also became a closed joint stock company.
- 2010: The company has launched its strategic plan to grow and contract with government sectors to implement optimizing, outsourcing and information technology projects.
- 2012: Launched the new Elm identity.
- 2014: The company continued its strategy to grow and started providing its services directly to the private sector in addition to government contracts to implement strategic projects for the country.
- 2016: Elm started offering its services to the global market.

== See also ==
- Minhaj (app)
