= Comparison of content-control software and providers =

This is a list of content-control software and services. The software is designed to control what content may or may not be viewed by a reader, especially when used to restrict material delivered over the Internet via the Web, e-mail, or other means. Restrictions can be applied at various levels: a government can apply them nationwide, an ISP can apply them to its clients, an employer to its personnel, a school to its teachers or students, a library to its patrons or staff, a parent to a child's computer or computer account or an individual to his or her own computer.

== Programs and services ==
Software	Installation	Platform	Types	App Control	Browser Restrictions
AppBlock	Client + browser extension	Android, iOS, desktop browsers	Screen time management	Yes	Yes
Covenant Eyes	Client	Windows, Mac, iOS, Android	Home use	Android and desktop.	Android and desktop: all. IOS: Safari.
DansGuardian	Server	Linux Server			
DP.security	Client + Cloud Console	Windows, Mac		No	Yes
DynDNS†	DNS	DNS			
FinFisher	Client + Server	Various	Surveillance software marketed to law enforcement agencies		
Green Dam Youth Escort	Client	Windows Desktop			
GoGuardian	Client	ChromeOS			Chrome
KidRex	Web Site		Child-safe search engine		
Microsoft Forefront Threat Management Gateway	Server	Windows Server			
Mobicip	Client	IOS, Android, Windows and Linux			
NetGenie	Network Appliance				
Net Nanny	Client	Windows, Mac OS, Android, and IOS		Yes	Yes
OnlineFamily.Norton	Client	Windows, Mac OS, IOS, and Android		Yes	No
OpenDNS	DNS	DNS			
Pumpic	Client	Android and iOS based	Parental control app		
SafeSearch	Web Site option	Web	A feature of Google Search		
Scieno Sitter	Client		used by Church of Scientology members under a non-disclosure agreement		
ScreenLimit	Client	Windows, Android, IOS and Kindle Fire	Blocks device after time is up	Yes	
Secure Web SmartFilter EDU	Server				
Sentry Parental Controls†	Client				
SurfWatch†	Client	Windows, Mac OS			
squidGuard	Server	Linux Server	URL redirector Squid plug-in		
UserGate Web Filter	Server + Cloud Service				
Webconverger†	Kiosk software	Linux Desktop			
WebMinder†	Server				
WebWatcher	Client	Windows, Mac OS, IOS, and Android based			
X3watch	Client	Windows, Mac OS, IOS, and Android based			
Zscaler	DNS + Cloud Service	All IP-based devices			
Software	Installation	Platform	Types	App Control	Browser Restrictions

== Providers ==
- Amesys
- Awareness Technologies
- Barracuda Networks
- Blue Coat Systems
- CronLab
- Cyberoam
- Detica
- Dope.security
- Fortinet
- GoGuardian
- Huawei
- Isheriff
- Lightspeed Systems
- Retina-X Studios
- SafeDNS
- Securly
- SmoothWall
- SonicWall
- Sophos
- SurfControl
- Webroot
- Websense
- MICT, 456.ir

== See also ==
- Accountability software
- Ad filtering
- Computer surveillance
- Deep packet inspection
- Deep content inspection
- Internet censorship
- Internet safety
- Parental controls
- Wordfilter
