= SafeDNS =

American cybersecurity company

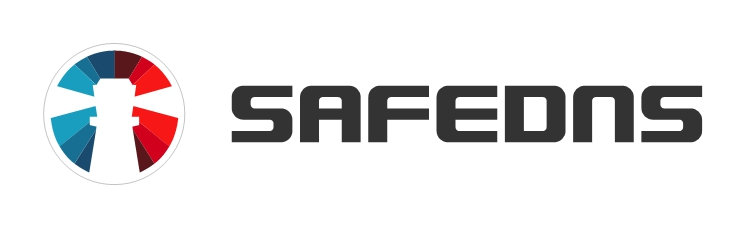
- Type: Private
- Industry: Web Content Filtering, Cyber Security
- Founded: 2010
- Headquarters: Alexandria, Virginia, US
- Number of employees: 11-50

SafeDNS is a cybersecurity company specializing in providing cloud-based web filtering solutions and AI-powered technology. Its headquarters is in Alexandria, Virginia.

== Origins and Initial Growth (2010-2020) ==
The company was founded in 2010 and has since gained recognition within the industry. During its initial years, SafeDNS focused on developing technology and establishing itself as a reliable provider of internet security solutions. The company invested in research and development. In 2015, SafeDNS integrated AI and machine learning into its content filtering solutions. By implementing continuous machine learning, SafeDNS can verify and categorize domains. With the aim of promoting stable filtering, the company employs several approaches and utilizes its own and third-party databases. If SafeDNS encounters a domain for the first time, it will redirect a user to a block page. The domain itself will be "quarantined" until it is assigned a category through scanning and a series of additional checks.

In 2015 SafeDNS was tested and certified as an approved parental control product by AV-Comparatives for the first time. Since then, the company has confirmed its status every year.

== Since 2020 ==
In 2022 the company launched new features such as Cyber Security categories and AppBlocker were introduced.

SafeDNS’ long-term plan is to create a unified cybersecurity platform at the DNS level, attempting to enable organizations to protect their network from existing and zero-day cyber threats and fully control the security of their network.

The company sees its product as a tool capable of adapting to threats and providing solutions for the security of company networks and several kinds of organizations.

== Product and Key Features ==
SafeDNS offers a cloud-based web filtering solution with a regularly updated database of existing domains. It filters the internet at the DNS layer with AI-powered technology, such as domain categorization and malicious resource detection. SafeDNS helps to provide access only to relevant internet resources, protect the network from malicious and harmful content, and be compliant with every applicable law and regulation.

=== AppBlocker ===
The AppBlocker feature allows users to restrict access to all the domains associated with a specific service.

=== AI-powered categorization ===
AI-powered categorization which allows a user to block access to a whole category of websites based on their content and purpose. The web categorization system processes over 1 billion DNS requests each day, categorizes 400K per day and updates the database daily. There are Allow- and Denylists of websites that are either explicitly allowed or blocked, regardless of their category. SafeDNS Categories and the Allow/Denylist work together; Categories do not override the Allow/Denylist.

SafeDNS prevents any bypass for both the cloud-based system, and the software agent by blocking proxies and anonymizers.

=== SafeDNS Agents ===
The Agent software is designed to automatically launch and manage the SafeDNS web filtering service on Windows, MacOS, Linux, or Android-based devices. It works on any network, even behind the NAT (Network Address Translation), and filtering settings take priority over the router-level filter settings.

=== Internet Schedule ===
The Internet Schedule feature enables users to set time restrictions for internet access.

=== Internet Usage Statistics ===
SafeDNS users receive visual comprehensive reports about the domain names of resources visited by their staff, students, clients, or family.

== Compliance ==
SafeDNS meets modern internet usage policy standards, its web filtering is compliant with all CIPA (Children's Internet Protection Act) rules and regulations in education from the IWF (Internet Watch Foundation), BpjM (Federal Department for Media Harmful to Young Persons), and HIPAA (Health Insurance Portability and Accountability Act).

== Courses ==
Safe DNS provides two complimentary online courses: Cybersecurity Awareness Training and Basics of Web Filtering.

The Cybersecurity Awareness Training course is designed to raise users' awareness of various risks associated with Bring Your Own Device (BYOD) policies, email communications, and Wi-Fi connections. It covers topics such as different types of malware and methods for protecting passwords.

The Basics of Web Filtering course offers insight into the functionality of web filtering and provides guidance on utilizing the SafeDNS dashboard effectively. This course aims to help users understand how web filtering works and how to navigate the SafeDNS platform.

== Industries ==
SafeDNS provides web security solutions to a wide range of industries, including enterprises, SMBs, MSPs, OEMs, education, non-profit organizations, MSPs, ISPs, WiFi and telecom providers, and individual households.

== Awards ==
SafeDNS has received recognition through a number of awards. In 2021, its solution was included in the Capterra 2021 shortlist of the best cybersecurity software. The SafeDNS product was ranked among the top 10 out of 515 evaluated by users and analyzed by Capterra.

In 2021, SafeDNS received an overall score of 4.7 out of 5 across all three Gartner Digital Markets sites: Capterra, Software Advice, and GetApp.

In 2022, the web-filtering service won the Best Value Software award at the SoftwareSuggest Winter Recognition Awards.

SafeDNS has also been recognized many times as Top Performer in the Cloud Cybersecurity Software category by SourceForge.

In 2023 it was recognized as an Emerging Favorite by Capterra in two categories: Endpoint Protection and Cloud Security.

== Geography ==
SafeDNS operates internationally. Its products and services are available in 69 countries, including Australia, Canada, France, Germany, Great Britain, Japan, the Netherlands, Peru, Singapore, South Africa, South Korea, and the United States.

== See also ==
- Google Public DNS
- Norton ConnectSafe
- OpenDNS
- Zscaler
