= Sentry Parental Controls =

Sentry Parental Controls was a group of content-control software packages, designed to log, notify, and block Internet content that its users saw as unsuitable for children.

The software was developed by SearchHelp Inc. (OTCBB: SHLP). In 2009, SearchHelp changed its name to Echometrix Inc. (OTCBB: EHMI). In 2010, EchoMetrix changed its name to ProText Mobility Inc. (OTCBB: TXTM).

In 2008, the company's software packages comprised Sentry At Home and Sentry Remote. Sentry Predator Locator was discontinued in December 2007.

In common with other software of this type, it provided parental controls on the use of web browsers, instant messaging, file transfers and other applications through a web-based control panel and updates on a computer with real-time protection. The person who had installed the software could log into this control panel from any other computer with the option to allow or block certain words, phrases, URLs and categories that they considered inappropriate.

The software was endorsed by American football player Drew Bledsoe in January 2008 as part of the "Parenting With Dignity" program. Sentry Parental Controls - UK was launched on April 8, 2008. Coleen Nolan from Loose Women virally launched the software and later that month a technology reviewer in the Daily Telegraph called it a "Must Have". As of October 2008, it was in use by 30,000 parents in the US.

In 2010, the US Federal Trade Commission settled a lawsuit it had filed against EchoMetrix. The company was charged with selling information gathered via Sentry Parental Controls to marketing organizations. According to the FTC, "The only disclosure made to parents about this practice was a vague statement approximately 30 paragraphs into a multi-page end user license agreement." The terms of the settlement required EchoMetrix to destroy its existing data gathered through the software and refrain from sharing such data. The US Department of Defense's Army and Air Force Exchange Service had removed the product's listing in October 2009 after privacy concerns were raised by the Electronic Privacy Information Center.

== See also ==
- Comparison of content-control software and providers
- Content-control software
- Computer surveillance
- Internet censorship
