= SurfWatch =

Internet filtering software company

SurfWatch, Inc.
- Type: Private
- Industry: Internet filtering
- Founded: 1994
- Founders: Ann Duvall, Bill Duvall, Jay Friedland
- Fate: Acquired by Spyglass, Inc. in May 1996; later sold to JSB Software Technologies and merged with SurfControl; acquired by Websense in 2007
- Headquarters: Los Altos, California, U.S.
- Products: SurfWatch Internet filtering software

SurfWatch, Inc. was a Los Altos, CA-based company which pioneered the first widely available filtering software that allowed users to block explicit content on the Internet. By disallowing computers from accessing specified sites and by screening for newsgroups likely to contain sexually explicit material, SurfWatch was able to aid parents, educators and employers in preventing access to offensive material from a specific computer. The Apple Macintosh version of SurfWatch 1.0 was developed starting in 1994, first shipped to the public in May 1995, and was followed by the Microsoft version in July of the same year.

Due to its specific locus of control, SurfWatch and various similar software programs played an instrumental role in helping to overturn the Communications Decency Act, as they offered an alternative to internet censorship. Because Surfwatch gave users a choice as to what should be blocked, it offered an alternative to broad censorship of online material. Surfwatch has been criticized by Peacefire for unfairly blocking gay and lesbian resource sites.

== Founders ==
Surfwatch was founded by Ann Duvall, Bill Duvall, and Jay Friedland.

Ann Duvall, President of SurfWatch software had performed a wide variety of roles in high-tech prior to her involvement with SurfWatch.

Bill Duvall, CEO of Surfwatch, had been previously involved in founding and developing technology companies for 30 years. In the course of his work, he gained the distinction of writing the software which sent the first package across the Internet in 1969. He coauthored RFC’s 1, 2 and 3. Bill is featured in a video on the 40th anniversary of the Internet. Since their work on SurfWatch, Bill Duvall and Ann Duvall have gone on to create “ChoosetheBlue.com,” a website that provided information as to which companies had employees that primarily supported democratic candidates and which companies had employees who primarily supported republican candidates. The site was intended to encourage consumers to spend money in places that would support democratic causes.

Jay Friedland, who acted as Vice President of Marketing and Sales had 15 years of experience in high-tech management at the time of SurfWatch's creation. He has since gone on to assist Internet start-up companies in establishing new business models for commerce on the net. Currently, he works as Vice President of Strategy and Sustainability for Zero Motorcycles and as Legislative Director for Plug In America.

== Software in Court ==
In 1995, the U.S. Senate set out to ban Internet users from posting illicit content. In the measure, the Senate endorsed “severe penalties” for those who posted “everything from child pornography to profanity.” Despite the seeming impossibility of accurate enforcement, the measure outraged many American citizens. Those who opposed the measure believed that censorship of the Internet was an infringement on their right to free speech. Opponents of the Congressional legislation believed that technology that blocks access is preferable to an outright ban. At the time of the legislation, SurfWatch was one of the only companies offering an Internet filter. A majority of the technology industry believed the best way to shield children from inappropriate content was, as journalist Steve Lohr put it, “with specialized software, enabling parents to block access to certain computer-network traffic.” Thus, as an alternative to complete Internet censorship, software such as SurfWatch played a key role in the overturning of the 1996 Communications Decency Act, for it provided Internet users to limit access controlled audiences, rather than limiting the whole of Internet content to all.

== Acquisition ==
SurfWatch was acquired by Spyglass, Inc. in May 1996.

Spyglass later sold SurfWatch to JSB Software Technologies, who merged the software with its own SurfControl division, with plans to continue the software's service to clients such as Microsoft Corp's WebTV, Comcast Corp, Worldgate, Excite@Home, American Interactive Media and NTL.

In September 2007 Websense acquired SurfControl.

== See also ==
- List of content-control software
- List of parental control software
