= Cupertino (disambiguation) =

Cupertino is a suburb of San Francisco and San Jose, California.

Cupertino may also refer to:

- Apple Inc., a technology company headquartered in Cupertino, by way of metonymy
- Cupertino effect, a common error in spell checkers
- Joseph of Cupertino (1603–1663), Italian Catholic saint
- Stevens Creek (California), formerly Cupertino Creek
- Cupertino (TV series), an American drama series

== See also ==
- Copertino, a town in the Lecce province of Italy
