= Peacefire =

- Editor: Bennett Haselton
- Website: www.peacefire.org
- Launched: August 1996; 30 years ago

Peacefire was a U.S.-based website, with a registered address in Bellevue, Washington, dedicated to "preserving First Amendment rights for Internet users, particularly those younger than 18". It was founded in August 1996 by Bennett Haselton, who still runs it. The site's motto is, "You'll understand when you're younger."

== Activism ==
Peacefire is primarily concerned with free speech rights and internet censorship, and providing information to the public about this. The authors on the site have been opponents of web content filtering and content-control software, which they refer to as "censorware". They have offered information and tools for defeating several common web filters, which has been controversial.

From the website's self-description in 2007:

The site has conducted long battles against the most commonly used filter programs, including, most famously, Net Nanny, CyberPatrol, and Bess. "In particular, Peacefire has demonstrated that the filter programs suppress political speech and filter preferentially for corporate and conservative causes. In other cases, Peacefire has presented evidence that several filtering programs block some websites without having a human being review those sites first, despite the filtering companies' claims to the contrary. However, Peacefire is not usually active against filters that act in a more neutral way.

Along with publishing ways of bypassing these programs, Peacefire publishes criticism of them and information about their practices, such as SurfWatch blocking gay and lesbian websites and then unblocking them.

One common test that Peacefire runs is to create web pages filled with content clipped from news items. In particular, they will take quotes from conservative politicians that seem politically sensitive. They will then submit the site to a filter and see if it gets blocked. They will then point out that the content deemed "inappropriate" on their pages was, in fact, "appropriate" when coming from a corporate (or conservative blog) site. They also routinely search out sites of liberal and progressive content to see if they are blocked. They then compile a report to point out how the said software is discriminatory and restrictive of free speech/free access in what it censors. They offer these reports to the software makers and later follow up to see if any corrective measures have been taken.

The site is also involved in alerting the online community of efforts to pass laws restricting content to websites. Peacefire's own website is often blocked, either in part or whole, by filtering software, and the organization has both sued and been threatened with lawsuits in civil court in the United States. Anyone of any age can become a member by signing up for the site's low-volume, announcement-only electronic mailing list.
