= UserGate Web Filter =

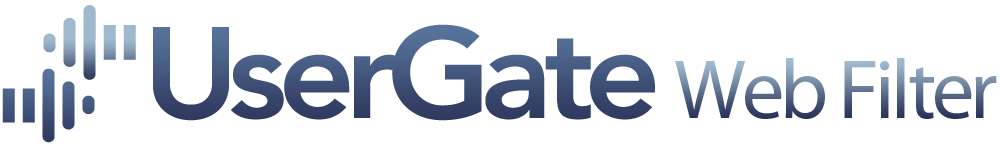
- Developer(s): Entensys
- Initial release: 25 February 2013
- Stable release: 4.2
- Available in: English, French, German, Spanish, Portuguese (Brazil), Russian, Arabic and Japanese
- Type: Content-control software, Ad filtering
- License: Proprietary commercial software
- Website: www.entensys.com/products/usergate-web-filter/overview

UserGate Web Filter performs Internet filtering for large and medium business, educational institutions, Internet providers, and public Wi-Fi access points. The solution works as content-control software and combines several filtering methods providing compliance with government regulations such as the Children's Internet Protection Act (CIPA). UserGate Web Filter operates as an ICAP-server receiving filtering requests from any proxy server or network gateway. The product provides DNS-filtering and content filtering based on Deep Content Inspection approach.

UserGate Web Filter uses the SAVAPI kernel developed by Avira to scan for viruses both web pages loaded from the Internet and downloaded files.

== Form factors ==
UserGate Web Filter is available as software or hardware appliance. The product is also available as VMware virtual appliance or ISO image. On September 20, 2013, Entensys announced porting UserGate Web Filter to Raspberry Pi platform.

== Reviews and awards ==
UserGate Web Filter was selected as a Reader Trust Award finalist in the Best Web Content Management Solution category for the SC Awards 2014 and as the winning solution in the Excellence Awards: Threat Solutions Best Web Content Management category at the 2015 SC Magazine Awards Europe.
