= Porn blocking =

Porn blocking or porn blocker can refer to:

- Internet censorship, when performed at the network level
- Content-control software, when performed at the device level
