= Scunthorpe (disambiguation) =

Scunthorpe is an English town and the administrative centre of the unitary authority of North Lincolnshire.

Scunthorpe may also refer to:

- Scunthorpe (UK Parliament constituency)
- Borough of Scunthorpe, a former district
- Scunthorpe United F.C., English football team based in the town of Scunthorpe
- Scunthorpe problem, problem related to unintended consequence of filtering text
- Scunthorpe Steelworks
