= Bennett Haselton =

American activist (born 1978)

Bennett Haselton (born November 20, 1978) is the founder of Circumventor.com and Peacefire.org, two US-based websites dedicated to combating Internet censorship. Peacefire.org is focused on documenting flaws in commercial Internet blocking programs. Circumventor.com is dedicated to distributing anti-censorship tools to users in countries such as China and Iran, and as of 2011 has over 3 million subscribers through distribution channels including email and Facebook pages.

Haselton has appeared on CNN and The Montel Williams Show to discuss First Amendment issues and been quoted in The New York Times, The Washington Post, The Seattle Times, and The Village Voice.

Haselton has testified before the US Child Online Protection Commission and as an expert witness for the ACLU.

He is the Guinness World Record holder for the most country capitals named in 60 seconds in response to a prompt of a random country name, achieving the first verified perfect score on December 12, 2015.

He listed in the Google Vulnerability Program Hall Of Fame for finding and fixing security holes in Google products.

== Early life and education ==
Haselton was born in Oklahoma. Haselton's father is a geophysicist and his mother is a piano teacher. Haselton lived in England and Denmark and graduated from Copenhagen International School. At 15, Haselton became a member of the Danish National Math Team.

Haselton's interest in censorship dates from when he was 10 years old and heard swear words for the first time.

In 1995 Haselton returned to the United States for college. Haselton earned a master's degree in mathematics from Vanderbilt University. After graduation, Haselton worked on Visual Basic at Microsoft for seven months. According to The New York Times, Haselton was fired from Microsoft, however Haselton disputes this

== PeaceFire ==
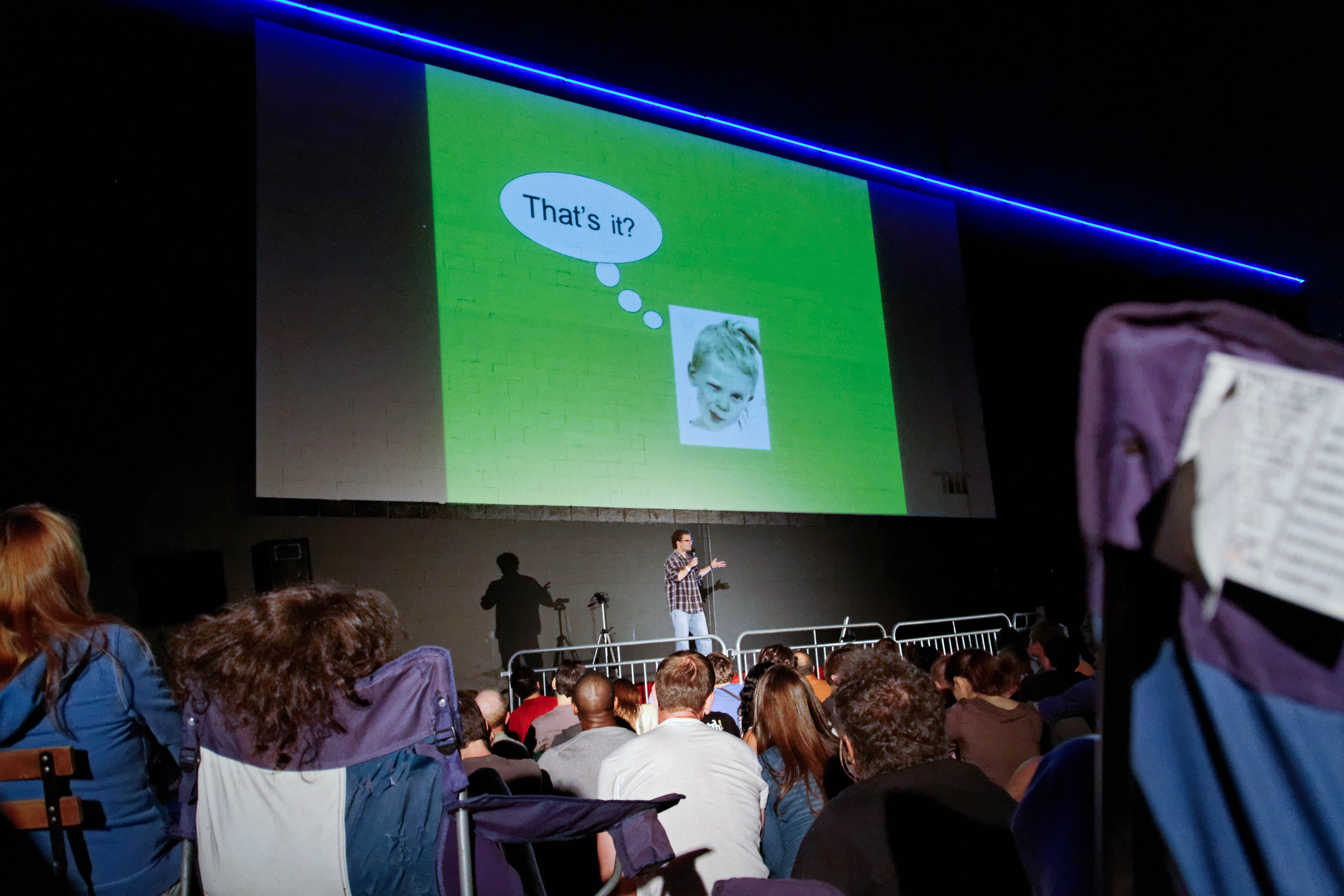
Haselton delivering a presentation on internet censorship at Ignite Seattle 2011

Haselton started PeaceFire in August 1996 to educate young people about the now-defunct 1996 Online Communications Decency Act.

Peacefire first received national attention in December 1996 when CYBERsitter added PeaceFire to their list of "pornographic" Web sites. CYBERsitter also sent a letter to PeaceFire's ISP threatening to block all of their hosted sites if they continued to host PeaceFire. Two years later in October 1998 PeaceFire started posting information about how to disable blocking programs.

Haselton has come under criticism for starting PeaceFire by Marc Kanter, marketing director for the company that makes the blocking program, Cybersitter.

In June 2006, reporters from the Los Angeles Times were blocked from accessing PeaceFire from their office.

=== Blacklists ===
In 2003, Haselton found out that the PeaceFire.org domain had been placed on a blacklist by the Mail Abuse Prevention System (MAPS) list because of complaints that his ISP, Media3 Technologies, refused to cut off service to companies suspected of "doing business with spammers." It took Haselton over a year to get off the MAPS list.

== Other activities ==
=== Internet security ===
Haselton found a security hole in Netscape that allowed web sites to gather details from visitors' computers, including bookmarks and cache information. Haselton earned a $15,000 bounty from Netscape in 2001 for uncovering holes in the company's browser software.

=== Anti-spam activities ===
Haselton has won 10 small-claims cases and thousands of dollars in judgments against senders of unwanted e-mail. Haselton has become one of the most well known anti-spam plaintiffs in the United States.

For example, in March 2002, Haselton won a $1000 award at King County District Court in Bellevue, Washington in each of three cases against Red Moss Media, Paulann Allison, and Richard Schueler (for sending misleading, unsolicited, commercial emails to its webmaster bearing deceptive information such as a forged return e-mail address or a misleading subject line), in a test of Washington's tough anti-spamming laws.

=== Testimony ===
At 21, Haselton testified before the commission mandated by the Child Online Protection Act, where he presented evidence that the error rate in most commercial blocking programs was much higher than commonly believed. In 2007, he testified as an expert witness for the American Civil Liberties Union of Washington, in the ACLU's lawsuit against the North Central Regional Library District, where a filter was enforced on library computers for all patrons including adults. Haselton's tests showed that sites which the library filter had blocked as "pornography" included a church, an immigration rights group, and the Seattle Women's Jazz Orchestra, and overall that about one in four .org sites blocked by the library filter was blocked in error.
