= Accountability software =

Type of surveillance software

Accountability software, or shameware, is a type of surveillance software that records the user's Internet activity and reports it to another person, often called an accountability partner. This person is often, but not necessarily, an authority figure, such as a parent, teacher, spouse or religious leader. The purpose of such software is to change the user's behavior by exposing them to shame and possibly other consequences for Internet activity that the authority figure deems inappropriate, such as viewing pornography.

Accountability software typically functions by continuously making screenshots of the user's mobile phone or computer screen and monitoring their internet traffic. It checks both for keywords (such as "gay" or "porn") and images associated with the behavior the software is intended to detect. If such content is found, the software generates a report that is transmitted to the authority figure controlling the software, who may then confront the user about their activity. The software may also double as content-control software.

As of 2022, a "multimillion-dollar ecosystem" of accountability software products exists, marketed to parents and churches. The largest users of accountability software are religious groups and families. Products in this field include Fortify, Accountable2You, EverAccountable, Best Accountability/Truple, and Covenant Eyes; there are also free options, including Net Responsibility (for Mac OS and Linux) and the free version of X3watch (for Windows and Mac OS).

Most of these products implement a "zero-tolerance" approach to pornography, and some are marketed as a way to combat "pornography addiction", as in the case of Covenant Eyes, which made roughly US$4 million in 2008, from around 56,000 subscriptions. Following a Wired report in 2022, Google removed Covenant Eyes and Accountable2You from the Google Play store because these apps used accessibility functionalities for surveillance purposes in a manner prohibited by Google, but Covenant Eyes was later reinstated.

== See also ==
- Content-control software
- Employee monitoring
- Employee monitoring software
- Comparison of content-control software and providers (incl. parental control software)
- Opposition to pornography
- Parental controls
- Pornography addiction
- Sexaholics Anonymous
