= Blacklist (computing) =

Criteria to control computer access

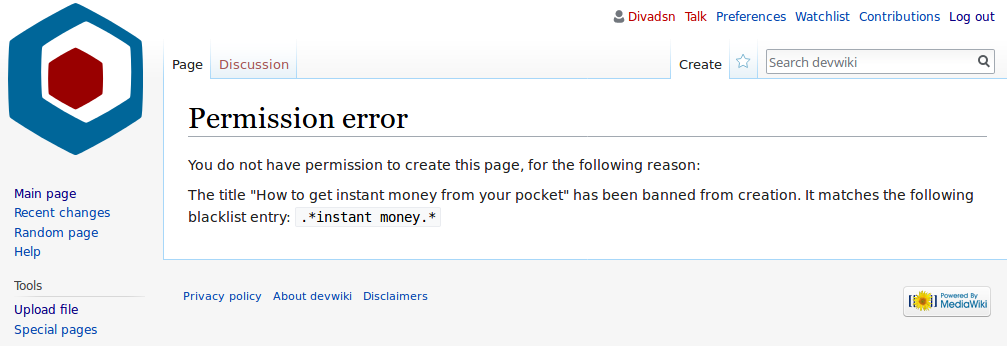
Screenshot of a website blocking the creation of content which matches a regular expression term on its blacklist

In computing, a blacklist, disallowlist, blocklist, or denylist is a basic access control mechanism that allows through all elements (email addresses, users, passwords, URLs, IP addresses, domain names, file hashes, etc.), except those explicitly mentioned. Those items on the list are denied access. The opposite is a whitelist, allowlist, or passlist, in which only items on the list are let through whatever gate is being used. A greylist contains items that are temporarily blocked (or temporarily allowed) until an additional step is performed.

Blacklists can be applied at various points in a security architecture, such as a host, web proxy, DNS servers, email server, firewall, directory servers or application authentication gateways. The type of element blocked is influenced by the access control location. DNS servers may be well-suited to block domain names, for example, but not URLs. A firewall is well-suited for blocking IP addresses, but less so for blocking malicious files or passwords.

Example uses include a company that might prevent a list of software from running on its network, a school that might prevent access to a list of websites from its computers, or a business that wants to ensure their computer users are not choosing easily guessed, poor passwords.

== Examples of systems protected ==
Blacklists are used to protect a variety of systems in computing. The content of the blacklist is likely needs to be targeted to the type of system defended.

=== Information systems ===
An information system includes end-point hosts like user machines and servers. A blacklist in this location may include certain types of software that are not allowed to run in the company environment. For example, a company might blacklist peer to peer file sharing on its systems. In addition to software, people, devices and Web sites can also be blacklisted.

=== Email ===
Most email providers have an anti-spam feature that essentially blacklists certain email addresses if they are deemed unwanted. For example, a user who wearies of unstoppable emails from a particular address may blacklist that address, and the email client will automatically route all messages from that address to a junk-mail folder or delete them without notifying the user.

An e-mail spam filter may keep a blacklist of email addresses, any mail from which would be prevented from reaching its intended destination. It may also use sending domain names or sending IP addresses to implement a more general block.

In addition to private email blacklists, there are lists that are kept for public use, including:

- China Anti-Spam Alliance
- Fabel Spamsources
- Spam and Open Relay Blocking System
- The DrMX Project

=== Web browsing ===
The goal of a blacklist in a web browser is to prevent the user from visiting a malicious or deceitful web page via filtering locally. A common web browsing blacklist is Google's Safe Browsing, which is installed by default in Firefox, Safari, and Chrome.

=== Usernames and passwords ===
Blacklisting can also apply to user credentials. It is common for systems or websites to blacklist certain reserved usernames that are not allowed to be chosen by the system or website's user populations. These reserved usernames are commonly associated with built-in system administration functions. Also usually blocked by default are profane words and racial slurs.

Password blacklists are very similar to username blacklists but typically contain significantly more entries than username blacklists. Password blacklists are applied to prevent users from choosing passwords that are easily guessed or are well known and could lead to unauthorized access by malicious parties. Password blacklists are deployed as an additional layer of security, usually in addition to a password policy, which sets the requirements of the password length and/or character complexity. This is because there are a significant number of password combinations that fulfill many password policies but are still easily guessed (i.e., Password123, Qwerty123).

== Distribution methods ==
Blacklists are distributed in a variety of ways. Some use simple mailing lists. A DNSBL is a common distribution method that leverages the DNS itself. Some lists make use of rsync for high-volume exchanges of data. Web-server functions may be used; either simple GET requests may be used or more complicated interfaces such as a RESTful API.

== Examples ==
- Companies like Google, Symantec and Sucuri keep internal blacklists of sites known to have malware and they display a warning before allowing the user to click them.
- Content-control software such as DansGuardian and SquidGuard may work with a blacklist in order to block URLs of sites deemed inappropriate for a work or educational environment. Such blacklists can be obtained free of charge or from commercial vendors such as Squidblacklist.org.
- There are also free blacklists for Squid (software) proxy, such as Blackweb
- A firewall or IDS may also use a blacklist to block known hostile IP addresses and/or networks. An example for such a list would be the OpenBL project.
- Many copy protection schemes include software blacklisting.
- The company Password RBL offers a password blacklist for Microsoft's Active Directory, web sites and apps, distributed via a RESTful API.
- Members of online auction sites may add other members to a personal blacklist. This means that they cannot bid on or ask questions about your auctions, nor can they use a "buy it now" function on your items.
- Yet another form of list is the yellow list which is a list of email server IP addresses that send mostly good email but do send some spam. Examples include Yahoo, Hotmail, and Gmail. A yellow listed server is a server that should never be accidentally blacklisted. The yellow list is checked first and if listed then blacklist tests are ignored.
- In Linux modprobe, the blacklist modulename entry in a modprobe configuration file indicates that all of the particular module's internal aliases are to be ignored. There are cases where two or more modules both support the same devices, or a module invalidly claims to support a device.
- Many web browsers have the ability to consult anti-phishing blacklists in order to warn users who unwittingly aim to visit a fraudulent website.
- Many peer-to-peer file sharing programs support blacklists that block access from sites known to be owned by companies enforcing copyright. An example is the Bluetack blocklist set.

== Usage considerations ==
As expressed in a recent conference paper focusing on blacklists of domain names and IP addresses used for Internet security, "these lists generally do not intersect. Therefore, it appears that these lists do not converge on one set of malicious indicators." This concern combined with an economic model means that, while blacklists are an essential part of network defense, they need to be used in concert with whitelists and greylists.

== Controversy over terminology ==
Some major technology companies and institutions have publicly distanced themselves from the term blacklist due to a perceived connection with racism, instead recommending the terms denylist or blocklist. The term's connection with racism, as well as the value in avoiding its use has been disputed.

== Controversy over use of the term ==
In 2018, a journal commentary on a report on predatory publishing was released which claimed that "white" and "black" are racially-charged terms that need to be avoided in instances such as "whitelist" and "blacklist", and that the first recorded usage of "blacklist" was during "the time of mass enslavement and forced deportation of Africans to work in European-held colonies in the Americas". The article hit mainstream in Summer 2020 following the George Floyd protests in the United States.

A number of technology companies replaced "whitelist" and "blacklist" with new alternatives such as "allow list" and "deny list", alongside similar terminology changes regarding the terms "Master" and "Slave". For example, in August 2018, Ruby on Rails changed all occurrences of "blacklist" and "whitelist" to "restricted list" and "permitted list". Other companies responded to this controversy in June and July 2020:

- GitHub announced that it would replace many "terms that may be offensive to developers in the black community".
- Apple Inc. announced at its developer conference that it would be adopting more inclusive technical language and replacing the term "blacklist" with "deny list" and the term "whitelist" with "allow list".
- Linux Foundation said it would use neutral language in kernel code and documentation in the future and avoid terms such as "blacklist" and "slave" going forward.
- The Twitter Engineering team stated its intention to move away from a number of terms, including "blacklist" and "whitelist".
- Red Hat announced that it would make open source more inclusive and avoid these and other terms.

ZDNet reports that the list of technology companies making such decisions "includes Twitter, GitHub, Microsoft, LinkedIn, Ansible, Red Hat, Splunk, Android, Go, MySQL, PHPUnit, Curl, OpenZFS, Rust, JP Morgan, and others."

The issue and subsequent changes caused controversy in the computing industry, where "whitelist" and "blacklist" are prevalent (e.g. IP whitelisting). Those that oppose these changes question the term's attribution to race, claiming that the term "blacklist" arose from the practice of using black books in medieval England.
