= SquidGuard =

Content-control software

- Stable release: 1.4 / January 3, 2009; 16 years ago
- Operating system: Unix-like
- Type: Content-control software
- License: GPLv2
- Website: squidguard.org

SquidGuard is a URL redirector software, which can be used for content control of websites users can access. It is written as a plug-in for Squid and uses blacklists to define sites for which access is redirected. SquidGuard must be installed on a Unix or Linux computer such as a server computer. The software's filtering extends to all computers in an organization, including Windows and Macintosh computers.

It was originally developed by Pål Baltzersen and Lars Erik Håland, and was implemented and extended by Lars Erik Håland in the 1990s at Tele Danmark InterNordia. Version 1.4, the current stable version, was released in 2009, and version 1.5 was in development as of 2010. New features in version 1.4 included optional authentication via a MySQL database.

SquidGuard is free software licensed under the GNU General Public License (GPL) version 2. It is included in many Linux distributions including Debian, openSUSE and Ubuntu.

== Blacklist Sources ==
The url filtering capabilities of SquidGuard depend largely on the quality of the Blacklists used with it. Several options are available. Free lists can be found at Shallalist.de or at Université Toulouse 1 Capitole.

== See also ==
- DansGuardian
- Internet censorship
- Content-control software
