= Internet pornography =

Any pornography that is accessible over the Internet

Internet pornography or online pornography is any pornography that is accessible over the Internet; primarily via websites, FTP connections, peer-to-peer file sharing, or Usenet newsgroups. The greater accessibility of the World Wide Web from the late 1990s led to an incremental growth of Internet pornography, the use of which among adolescents and adults has since become increasingly popular.

Danni's Hard Drive started in 1995 by Danni Ashe is considered one of the earliest online pornography websites. In 2020, estimates suggested there were nearly 30 million pornography websites, comprising about 12% of all websites on the Internet. In 2022, the total amount of pornographic content accessible online was estimated to be over 10,000 terabytes. The four most accessed pornography websites are Pornhub, xHamster, XVideos, and XNXX.

As of 2025, a single company, Aylo, owns and operates most of the popular online streaming pornography websites, including: Pornhub, RedTube, Tube8, and YouPorn, as well as pornographic film studios like: Brazzers, Digital Playground, Reality Kings, and Sean Cody among others, but it does not own websites like xHamster, XVideos, and XNXX. Some have alleged that the company is a monopoly.

== Introduction ==
Starting in the late 1980s, the Internet has played a major part in increasing access to pornography. Usenet newsgroups provided the base for what has been called the "amateur revolution" where amateur pornographers, with the help of digital cameras and the Internet, created and distributed their own pornographic content independent of the mainstream networks.

The use of the World Wide Web became popular with the introduction of Netscape navigator in 1994. This development paved the way for newer methods of distribution and consumption of pornography.

The Internet as a medium to access pornography became so popular that in 1995 Time published a cover story titled "Cyberporn".

Danni's Hard Drive started in 1995, by Danni Ashe is considered one of the earliest online pornographic websites; coded by Ashe, a former stripper and nude model, the website was reported by CNN in 2000 to have made revenues of $6.5 million.

In 2012, the total number of pornographic websites was estimated to be around 25 million, comprising 12% of all websites.

In 2022, the amount of pornographic content accessible online was estimated at over 10,000 terabytes. (Note: Aided by the easy online accessibility of more than 10,000 Terabytes of pornographic content, frequent consumption of Internet pornography, particularly among young adolescents and adults, has become increasingly popular.)

In 2024, according to the DSA regulation, 59 out of 100 Spaniards visits one of the three biggest websites monthly.

Before its shutdown in 2025, ThisAV was a popular pornographic website in Hong Kong.

== History and methods of distribution ==
=== Before the World Wide Web ===
Pornography is regarded by some as one of the driving forces behind the expansion of the World Wide Web, like camcorders, VCRs and cable television before it. Prior to the development of the World Wide Web, pornographic images had been transmitted over the Internet as ASCII porn. To send images over network required computers with graphics capabilities and higher network bandwidth. In the late 1980s and early 1990s this was possible through the use of anonymous FTP servers and the Gopher protocol, an early content delivery protocol that was later displaced by HTTP. Beginning with the first JPEG-compressed test images were a set of four pictures, entitled; 'Boats', 'Barbara', 'Toys', and 'Zelda', which were created on June 18, 1987, in Copenhagen, Denmark by the Joint Photographic Experts Group formed in 1986 to build a universal way to compress digital images with a cropped scan of model Lena Sjööblom (Söderberg) (from a 1972 issue of Playboy) which is often called the "first JPEG" in pop culture because engineers used it frequently as an early test image. The JPE Group finalized and published the official JPEG standard specification on September 18, 1992. One of the early Gopher/FTP sites to compile pornography was the Digital Archive on the 17th Floor at TU Delft. This small image archive contained some low quality scanned pornographic images that were initially available to anyone anonymously. The site soon became restricted to Netherlands only access after traffic grew to over 10,000 users around the world, who were obtaining approximately 30,000 images a day.

=== Usenet groups ===
Usenet newsgroups provided an early way of sharing images over the narrow bandwidth available in the early 1990s. Because of the network restrictions of the time, images had to be encoded as ascii text and then broken into sections before being posted to the Alt.binaries of the usenet. These files could then be downloaded and then reassembled before being decoded back to an image. Automated software such as Aub (Assemble Usenet Binaries) allowed the automatic download and assembly of the images from a newsgroup. There was rapid growth in the number of posts in the early 1990s but image quality was restricted by the size of files that could be posted.

This method was also used to disseminate pornographic images, which were usually scanned from adult magazines. This type of distribution was generally free (apart from fees for Internet access), and provided a great deal of anonymity. The anonymity made it safe and easy to ignore copyright restrictions, as well as protecting the identity of uploaders and downloaders. Around this time frame, pornography was also distributed via pornographic Bulletin Board Systems such as Rusty n Edie's. These BBSes could charge users for access, leading to the first commercial online pornography.

Martin Rimm, a Carnegie Mellon University graduate student, claimed that (as of 1994) 83.5% of the images on Usenet newsgroups where images were stored were pornographic in nature. Before publication, Philip Elmer-DeWitt used the research in a Time magazine article, "On a Screen Near You: Cyberporn." The findings were attacked by journalists and civil liberties advocates who insisted the findings were seriously flawed. "Rimm's implication that he might be able to determine 'the percentage of all images available on the Usenet that are pornographic on any given day' was sheer fantasy" wrote Mike Godwin in HotWired. The research was cited during a session of U.S. Congress. The student changed his name and disappeared from public view. Godwin recounts the episode in "Fighting a Cyberporn Panic" in his book Cyber Rights: Defending Free Speech in the Digital Age.

The invention of the World Wide Web spurred both commercial and non-commercial distribution of pornography. The rise of pornography websites offering photos, video clips and streaming media including live webcam access allowed greater access to pornography.

=== Free vs. commercial ===
Both commercial and free pornographic sites are common on the Internet. The bandwidth usage of a pornographic website is relatively high, which can lead to large web hosting and Internet costs. Free websites, which often use advertising revenue to earn income, may not earn a sufficient amount to cover the costs of web hosting. One entry into the free pornographic website market are thumbnail gallery post sites. These are free websites that post links to commercial sites, providing a sampling of the commercial site in the form of thumbnail images, or in the form of Free Hosted Galleries—samplings of full-sized content provided and hosted by the commercial sites to promote their site. Some free websites primarily serve as portals by keeping up-to-date indexes of these smaller sampler sites. When a user purchases a subscription to a commercial site after clicking through from a free thumbnail gallery site, the commercial site makes a payment to the owner of the free site. There are several forms of sites delivering adult content.

==== TGP ====
A common form of adult content is a categorized list (more often a table) of small pictures (called "thumbnails") linked to galleries. These sites are called a thumbnail gallery post (TGP). As a rule, these sites sort thumbnails by category and type of content available on a linked gallery. Sites containing thumbnails that lead to galleries with video content are called MGP (movie gallery post). The main benefit of TGP/MGP is that the surfer can get a first impression of the content provided by a gallery without actually visiting it.

However, TGP sites are open to abuse, with the most abusive form being the so-called CJ (abbreviation for circlejerk), that contains links that mislead the surfer to sites he or she actually did not wish to see. This is also called a redirect.

==== Linklists ====
Linklists, unlike TGP/MGP sites, do not display a huge number of pictures. A linklist is a (frequently) categorised web list of links to so-called "freesites*", but unlike TGPs, links are provided in a form of text, not thumbs. It is still a question which form is more descriptive to a surfer, but many webmasters cite a trend that thumbs are much more productive, and simplify searching. On the other hand, linklists have a larger amount of unique text, which helps them improve their positions in search engine listings. TopLists are linklists whose internal ranking of freesites is based on incoming traffic from those freesites, except that freesites designed for TopLists have many more galleries.

==== Peer-to-peer ====
Peer-to-peer file sharing networks provide another form of free access to pornography. While such networks have been associated largely with the illegal sharing of copyrighted music and movies, the sharing of pornography has also been a popular use for file sharing. Many commercial sites have recognized this trend and have begun distributing free samples of their content on peer-to-peer networks.

== Viewership ==
As of 2011, the majority of viewers of online pornography were men; women tended to prefer romance novels and erotic fan fiction. Women comprised about one quarter to one third of visitors to popular pornography websites, but were only 2% of subscribers to pay sites. Subscribers with female names were flagged as signs of potential credit card fraud, because "so many of these charges result in an angry wife or mother demanding a refund for the misuse of her card."

Nonetheless, women spend more time on average on pornography websites, particularly Pornhub, than men and were more interested in pornography upon marriage. An anti-porn research group, Barna Group and Covenant Eyes, reported in 2020 that "33% of women aged 25 and under search for porn at least once per month.

A 2015 study found "a big jump" in pornography viewing over the past few decades, with the largest increase driven by the people born in the 1970s and 1980s. While the study's authors noted this increase is "smaller than conventional wisdom might predict," it is still quite significant. Those who were born since the 1980s onward were the first to grow up in a world where they had access to the Internet from their teenage years, this early exposure and accessibility of Internet pornography might have been the primary driver of this increase.

States that are highly religious and conservative were found to search for more Internet pornography.

== Internet pornography formats ==
=== Image files ===
Pornographic images may be either scanned into the computer from photographs or magazines, produced with a digital camera or a frame from a video before being uploading onto a pornographic website. The JPEG format is one of the most common formats for these images. Another format is GIF which may provide an animated image where the people in the picture move. It can last for only a second or two up to a few minutes and then reruns (repeats) indefinitely. If the position of the objects in the last frame is about the same as the first frame, there is the illusion of continuous action.

=== Video files and streaming video ===
Pornographic video clips may be distributed in a number of formats, including MPEG, WMV, and QuickTime. More recently, VCD and DVD image files allow the distribution of whole VCDs and DVDs. Many commercial porn sites exist that allow one to view pornographic streaming video. As of 2020, some Internet pornography sites have begun offering 5K resolution content, while 1080p and 4K resolution are still more common.

Since mid-2006, advertising-supported free pornographic video sharing websites based on the YouTube format have appeared. Referred to as Porn 2.0, these sites generally use Flash technology to distribute videos that were uploaded by users; these include user-generated content as well as scenes from commercial porn movies and advertising clips from pornographic websites.

=== Webcams ===
Another format of adult content that emerged with the advent of the Internet is live webcams. Webcam content can generally be divided into two categories: group shows offered to members of an adult paysite, and one-on-one private sessions usually sold on a pay-per-view basis.

Server-based webcam sex shows spur unique international economics: adult models in various countries perform live webcam shows and chat for clients in affluent countries. This kind of activity is sometimes mediated by companies that will set up websites and manage finances. They may maintain "office" space for the models to perform from, or they provide the interface for models to work at home, with their own computer with webcam. As of 2020, most so-called cam hosts stream directly from their home, due to the availability of fast Internet and cheap HD webcams. These models earn money through tips or by selling exclusive content to their viewers through live cam sites, which can reach more than 20,000 viewers at once. Live cam sites are very popular with sites like Chaturbate or LiveJasmin appearing among the 100 most popular websites according to Alexa Internet.

=== Other formats ===
Other formats include text and audio files. While pornographic and erotic stories, distributed as text files, web pages, and via message boards and newsgroups, have been semi-popular, audio porn, via formats like MP3 and FLV, have increased in popularity. Audio pornography can include recordings of people having sex or simply reading erotic stories. (Pornographic magazines are available in Zinio format, which provides a reader program to enable access.)

Combination formats, such as webteases that consist of images and text are also common.

== Legal status ==
The Internet is an international network and there are currently no international laws regulating pornography; each country deals with Internet pornography differently. Generally, in the United States, if the act depicted in the pornographic content is legal in the jurisdiction that it is being distributed from then the distributor of such content would not be in violation of the law regardless of whether it is accessible in countries where it is illegal. This does not apply to those who access the pornography, however, as they could still be prosecuted under local laws in their country. Due to enforcement problems in anti-pornography laws over the Internet, countries that prohibit or heavily restrict access to pornography have taken other approaches to limit access by their citizens, such as employing content filters.

Many activists and politicians have expressed concern over the easy availability of Internet pornography, especially to minors. This has led to a variety of attempts to restrict children's access to Internet pornography such as the 1996 Communications Decency Act in the United States. Some companies use an Adult Verification System (AVS) to deny access to pornography by minors. However, most Adult Verification Systems charge fees that are substantially higher than the actual costs of any verification they do (for example, in excess of $10/month) and are really part of a revenue collection scheme where sites encourage users to sign up for an AVS system, and get a percentage of the proceeds in return.

In response to concerns with regard to children accessing age-inappropriate content, the adult industry, through the Association of Sites Advocating Child Protection (ASACP), began a self-labeling initiative called the Restricted to Adults label (RTA). This label is recognized by many web filtering products and is entirely free to use.

Most employers have distinct policies against the accessing of any kind of online pornographic material from company computers, in addition to which some have also installed comprehensive filters and logging software in their local computer networks.

One area of Internet pornography that has been the target of the strongest efforts at curtailment is child pornography. Because of this, most Internet pornography websites based in the U.S. have a notice on their front page that they comply with 18 USC Section 2257, which requires the keeping of records regarding the age of the people depicted in photographs, along with displaying the name of the company record keeper. Some site operators outside the U.S. have begun to include this compliance statement on their websites as well.

On April 8, 2008 Evil Angel and its owner John Stagliano were charged in federal court with multiple counts of obscenity. One count was for, "using an interactive computer service to display an obscene movie trailer in a manner available to a person under 18 years of age."

More than a dozen U.S. states have enacted laws requiring age verification to access online pornography. United Kingdom also does a similar thing and France, Spain, Italy, Denmark and Greece as for test by 2025 as for Online Safety Act 2023 and EU Digital Services. The UK one will also include all the internet including social media like Discord, Reddit and X, gaming platforms like Steam, Xbox and more.

== Web filters and blocking software ==
A variety of content-control, parental control and filtering software is available to block pornography and other classifications of material from particular computers or (usually company-owned) networks. Commercially available Web filters include Bess, Net Nanny, SurfWatch, SeeNoEvil, and others. Various work-arounds and bypasses are available for some of these products; Peacefire is one of the most notable clearinghouses for such countermeasures.

== Child pornography ==
The Internet has radically changed how child pornography is reproduced and disseminated, and, according to the United States Department of Justice, resulted in a massive increase in the "availability, accessibility, and volume of child pornography." The production of child pornography has become very profitable, bringing in several billion dollars a year, and is no longer limited to pedophiles. Philip Jenkins notes that there is "overwhelming evidence that [child pornography] is all but impossible to obtain through nonelectronic means."

In 2006, the International Centre for Missing & Exploited Children (ICMEC) published a report of findings on the presence of child pornography legislation in the then-184 INTERPOL member countries. It later updated this information, in subsequent editions, to include 196 UN member countries. The report, entitled “Child Pornography: Model Legislation & Global Review,” assesses whether national legislation:

(1) exists with specific regard to child pornography; (2) provides a definition of child pornography; (3) expressly criminalizes computer-facilitated offenses; (4) criminalizes the knowing possession of child pornography, regardless of intent to distribute; and (5) requires ISPs to report suspected child pornography to law enforcement or to some other mandated agency.

ICMEC stated that it found in its initial report that only 27 countries had legislation needed to deal with child pornography offenses, while 95 countries did not have any legislation that specifically addressed child pornography, making child pornography a global issue worsened by the inadequacies of domestic legislation. The 7th Edition Report found that still only 69 countries had legislation needed to deal with child pornography offenses, while 53 did not have any legislation specifically addressing the problem. Over seven years of research from 2006 to 2012, ICMEC and its Koons Family Institute on International Law and Policy report that they have worked with 100 countries that have revised or put in place new child pornography laws.

The NCMEC estimated in 2003 that 20 percent of all pornography traded over the Internet was child pornography, and that since 1997, the number of child pornography images available on the Internet had increased by 1,500 percent. Regarding Internet proliferation, the US DOJ states that "At any one time there are estimated to be more than one million pornographic images of children on the Internet, with 200 new images posted daily." They also note that a single offender arrested in the United Kingdom possessed 450,000 child pornography images, and that a single child pornography site received a million hits in a month. Further, much of the trade in child pornography takes place at hidden levels of the Internet. It has been estimated that between 50,000 and 100,000 pedophiles are involved in organized pornography rings around the world, and that one third of them operate from the United States. Digital cameras and Internet distribution facilitated by the use of credit cards and the ease of transferring images across national borders has made it easier than ever before for users of child pornography to obtain the photographs and videos.

In 2007, the British-based Internet Watch Foundation reported that child pornography on the Internet was becoming more brutal and graphic, and the number of images depicting violent abuse had risen fourfold since 2003. The CEO stated "The worrying issue is the severity and the gravity of the images is increasing. We're talking about prepubescent children being raped." About 80 percent of the children in the abusive images were female, and 91 percent appeared to be children under the age of 12. Prosecution is difficult because multiple international servers are used, sometimes to transmit the images in fragments to evade the law.

== See also ==
- Adult movie theater – Movie theater designed for the exhibition of pornographic films
- Cybersex – Virtual sex encounter
- Internet sex addiction – Behavioral addiction
- Revenge porn – Non-consensual distribution of sexually explicit material
- Rule 34 – Internet slang regarding pornography
- Sexting – Sending sexually explicit text messages

== Bibliography ==
- Fritz, N; Malic, V; Fu, TC; Paul, B; Zhou, Y; Dodge, B; Fortenberry, JD; Herbenick, D (February 2022). "Porn Sex versus Real Sex: Sexual Behaviors Reported by a U.S. Probability Survey Compared to Depictions of Sex in Mainstream Internet-Based Male-Female Pornography". Archives of Sexual Behavior. 51 (2): 1187–1200. doi:10.1007/s10508-021-02175-6. PMC 8853281. PMID 35165802.
- Jacobs, Katrien; Pasquinelli, Matteo, eds. (2007). C'lickme: a netporn studies reader. Amsterdam: Institute of Network Cultures. ISBN 9789078146032.
- Jacobs, Katrien (2007). Netporn: DIY web culture and sexual politics. Lanham, Maryland: Rowman & Littlefield. ISBN 9780742554320.
- Jahnen, Matthias; Zeng, Leopold; Kron, Martina; Meissner, Valentin H.; Korte, Alexander; Schiele, Stefan; Schulwitz, Helga; Dinkel, Andreas; Gschwend, Jürgen E.; Herkommer, Kathleen (December 2022). "The role of pornography in the sex life of young adults-a cross-sectional cohort study on female and male German medical students". BMC Public Health. 22 (1): 1471–2458. doi:10.1186/s12889-022-13699-4. PMC 9252028. PMID 35787262.
- McCreadie Lillie, Jonathan James (March 2004). "Cyberporn, sexuality, and the net apparatus". Convergence. 10 (1): 43–65. doi:10.1177/135485650401000104.
- Paasonen, Susanna (2011). Carnal Resonance: Affect and Online Pornography (illustrated ed.). MIT Press. ISBN 9780262016315.
- Rosen, David (February 2023). "Pornography and the Erotic Phantasmagoria". Sexuality & Culture. 27 (1): 242–265. doi:10.1007/s12119-022-10011-9. PMC 9485786. PMID 36157715.
- Scarcelli, Cosimo Marco (July 2015). "'It is disgusting, but … ': adolescent girls' relationship to internet pornography as gender performance". Porn Studies. 2 (2–3): 237–249. doi:10.1080/23268743.2015.1051914.
