= N2H2 =

N2H2 may refer to:

- N_{2}H_{2}, Diazene, a chemical compound
- N2H2 (company), the company which developed the content-control software Bess
