= YapBrowser =

YapBrowser, also known as YapSearch or YapCash, is a rogue web browser that first appeared in 2006. Upon its release, security researchers found that YapBrowser redirected all traffic to a pornographic website which contained images of child pornography. In June 2006, YapBrowser was acquired by SearchWebMe, and it disappeared shortly thereafter. It reappeared in 2011, looking similar to its 2006 form.
