= ScreenLimit =

Time based content-control software

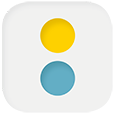
- Developer: ScreenLimit Ltd.
- Initial release: November 2016
- Stable release: 1.1 (All platforms)
- Operating system: Microsoft Windows, iOS, Android and Kindle Fire
- Type: Content Control
- License: Proprietary EULA
- Website: ScreenLimit Homepage

ScreenLimit was a time based content-control software for parents to control the time their children spend on devices.

== Working ==
Children can do assigned tasks like homework to earn more time. Multiple people can use the same or more devices in combination with their own time. They will get a warning when time runs out. When time runs out icons or the desktop will disappear and the ScreenLimit timer page will appear. Multiple schedules can be made like weekend/schoolday/vacation. An example of a schedule could be: Block at 22:00 (regardless of unspent time); Add 60 minutes (a day) at 00:01; UnBlock at 07:00. Parents can see realtime who is using what device. Parents can also manually (un)block a child. With one account multiple children and devices can be managed by multiple parents.

== History ==
ScreenLimit was first released in November 2016. ScreenLimit was closed on 22 January 2019.

== Reviews ==
PC Advisor gave it a 4-star rating (out of 4).

== See also ==
- Comparison of content-control software and providers
