= Loudoun v. Board of Trustees of the Loudoun County Library =

Mainstream Loudoun v. Board of Trustees of the Loudoun County Library
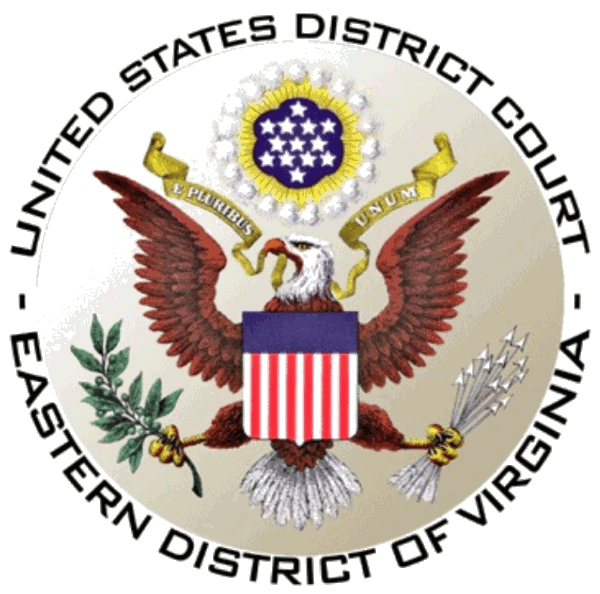
- Court: United States District Court for the Eastern District of Virginia
- Full case name: Mainstream Loudoun, et al. v. Board of Trustees of the Loudoun County Library
- Decided: November 23, 1998
- Docket nos.: 97-cv-2049
- Citation: 24 F. Supp. 2d 552

Court membership
- Judge sitting: Leonie M. Brinkema

In Mainstream Loudoun v. Board of Trustees of the Loudoun County Library, 24 F. Supp. 2d 552 (E.D. Va. 1998), a U.S. district court held that a county policy requiring filters on all of its public library Internet computers was an unconstitutional restriction of free speech.
