= Dope.security =

American cybersecurity company

dope.security
- Founded: May 4, 2021; 5 years ago in Mountain View, California, U.S.
- Founder: Kunal Agarwal
- Headquarters: Mountain View, California, U.S.
- Area served: Cybersecurity
- Number of employees: 45 (2026)
- Website: dope.security

dope.security is an American cybersecurity company founded in 2021. Based in Mountain View and Cork, the company focuses on secure web gateways.

== History ==
dope.security was founded by former Forcepoint and Symantec software engineer Kunal Agarwal on May 4, 2021. Following the shift of many companies to remote work following the COVID-19 pandemic, Agarwal founded dope.security to adapt secure web gateways to a growing market of workers accessing company servers through cloud computing or home Internet rather than centralized office networks. Speaking with TechCrunch, Agarwal recalled that during his engineering career, he encountered customers who complained about outages and other performance issues from existing secure web gateways that relied on data centers.

In September 2022, Boldstart Ventures provided the initial $4 million seed investment for dope.security, which began operations with 30 employees. With its headquarters in Mountain View, California, dope.security also has operations in Cork, Ireland.

Google Ventures, Boldstart Ventures, and Preface helped raise an additional $16 million to fund internal, endpoint-based secure web gateway technology development for dope.security in March 2023.

In July 2025, the company enhanced its Secure Web Gateway (SWG) to limit access to the consumer version of ChatGPT, ensuring that employees on corporate networks can only use the enterprise-licensed edition.

== Products ==
The main dope.security product is the Fly Direct Secure Web Gateway (dope.swg), which is based at a communication endpoint rather than stopover data centers. The zero trust security model of dope.swg is compatible with Office 365 and Google Workspace.
