= Sabily =

Ubuntu-based operating system

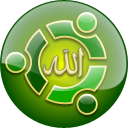

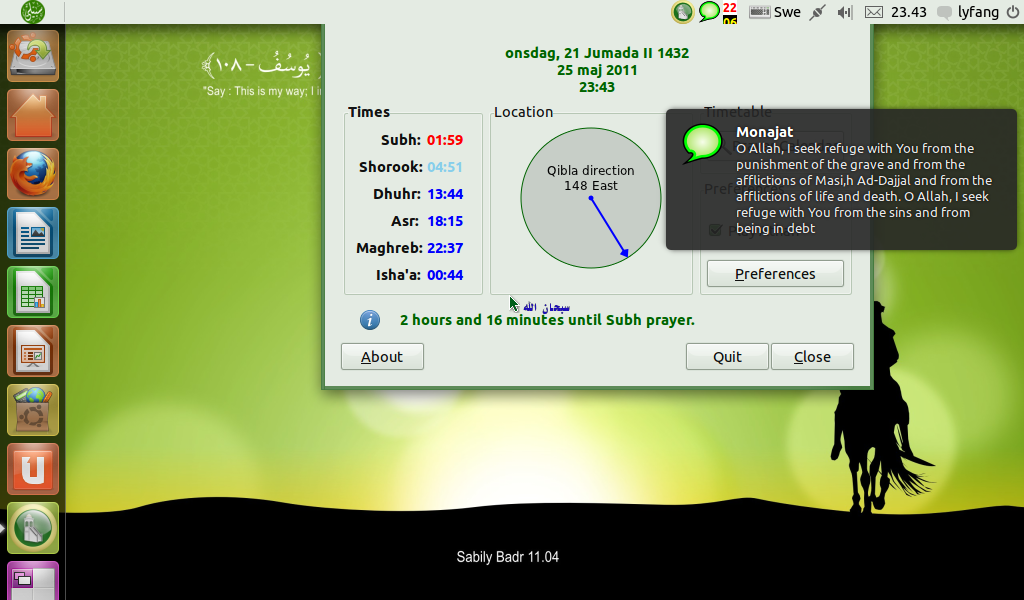
- Sabily Badr 11.04 Unity desktop
- OS family: Linux (Unix-like)
- Source model: Open source
- Latest release: 11.10 (Uhud) / December 19, 2011; 14 years ago
- Available in: Multilingual (more than 55)
- Update method: APT (front-ends available)
- Package manager: dpkg
- Supported platforms: x86 (32 bits) and x86-64 (64 bits)
- Kernel type: Monolithic (Linux)
- Default user interface: GNOME
- License: GNU GPL and others
- Official website: www.sabily.org

Sabily (Arabic: سبيلي, IPA: [sæˈbiːliː], My Way) is a discontinued Linux distribution based on Ubuntu, designed by and with the intent to be used by followers of Islam. Originally named Ubuntu Muslim Edition (presented as UbuntuME), development for Sabily was active from 2007 to 2011.

Sabily was designed for Muslim users to have out-of-the-box Arabic language support and Islamic software and tools installed, including a prayer times tool, a Qur'an study tool, Hijri calendar, etc.

The Unity shell is based on GNOME 3 on Sabily 11.10, Unity 2D for graphics cards without 3D capabilities. It became available on the Sabily 11.04 Badr DVD. Ubuntu Classic Desktop was the default desktop in Sabily (11.04). The full version of Sabily comes with out-of-the-box educational software, and codecs for commonly used media formats.

== Release history ==
Sabily followed the release schedule of Ubuntu. After Ubuntu 9.04, its name was changed from UbuntuME, to Sabily.

- UbuntuME 7.04 released 12 October 2007
- UbuntuME 7.10 released 2 December 2007
- UbuntuME 8.04 released 17 May 2008
- UbuntuME 8.04.1 released 22 July 2008
- Sabily 9.04 Taibah released 12 May 2009
- Sabily 9.10 Gaza released 27 December 2009
- Sabily 10.04 Manarat released 28 June 2010
- Sabily 11.04 Badr released 5 May 2011
- Sabily 11.10 Uhud released 19 December 2011

== Versions available ==
There are currently three versions of Sabily, but there is no official host at the moment.

- Small version (967.96 MB), contains the main Sabily packages, including artwork and Islamic applications and Arabic support.
- Full version (1.55 GB), contains the same as the Small version plus multimedia, educational and miscellaneous packages.
- Ultimate version (3.3 GB), has the same content as the Full version, plus Qur'an offline recitations provided by Muhammad Siddeeq al-Minshawi, Huzify, Saad al-Ghamadi and Mishary Rashed Alafasy.

Sabily is available as a Live DVD, which can be booted on the host computer without installation. The Wisabi installer can install Sabily to the hard disk within Microsoft Windows, without involving risky formatting or partitioning.

== Additional software ==
As compared to Ubuntu:

- zekr: Qur'anic Study Tool
- minbar: Islamic prayer times application
- monajat: Application that pops up prayers at predetermined times
- Firefox-praytimes: Firefox extension that displays Islamic daily prayer times
- webstrict: UI frontend to DansGuardian (web content filtering tool)
- nanny: GNOME Nanny parental-control system
- thwab: Electronic Encyclopedia System
- hijra: Islamic calendar
- mus-haf Othman: Othman Qur'an Browser
- noor: Qur'an viewer
- fsool: Abbreviated chapters in the Messenger vita
- rejaal: Men around the prophet

== Arabic support ==
- language-pack-ar: Translations for language Arabic
- language-pack-gnome-ar: GNOME translations for language Arabic
- mozilla-firefox-locale-ar: Mozilla Firefox Arabic language/region package
- aspell-ar: Arabic dictionary for aspell
- acon: Text console arabization
- bicon: Console that supports bidirectional text display
- arab-eyes-qamoos: Arabic-English dictionary
- fonts-hosny-amiri: Arabic Naskh style typographically oriented font (Amiri is a classical Arabic typeface in Naskh style for typesetting books and other running text)

== Sabily software ==
Zekr is an open platform Quran study tool for browsing and researching the Quran. Recitations and translations are available for download.

Small version DVD available online recitations:

- Abdulbasit Abdussamad (64 kbit/s)
- Mishary bin Rashid Al-Afasy (128 kbit/s)
- Saad Al-Ghamdi (40 kbit/s)
- Mohammed Siddiq Al-Minshawi (16 kbit/s)
- Maher Al-Muaiqly (128 kbit/s)
- Abu Bakr Ash-Shatri (128 kbit/s)
- Saud Al-Shuraim (128 kbit/s)
- Abdul Rahman Al-Sudais (192 kbit/s)

Minbar indicates the time when Muslims should pray. It runs in background as a tray icon and plays the athan (call to prayer) at prayer times. Minbar works with the main calculation methods, such as Muslim League (default), Shafii, and Hanafi. Muslims observe salat five times a day, and Minbar helps to remind the user of daily prayer times.

Monajat
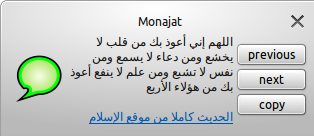
- Developer: Sabily Team
- Release: 2011-09-11 (v2.6.1-3)
- Operating system: Linux, Windows
- License: GPLv2
- Website: launchpad.net/monajat

Monajat is an application for Linux and Windows that displays Azkar messages. It runs in the background as a tray icon and displays hadiths. The application is an application provided by the Sabily community.

Zakat Calc
- Developers: Maui Sabily, Sabily Team
- Release: May 7, 2011; 15 years ago
- Written in: Gambas
- Operating system: Linux, Windows
- Available in: Malay, Indonesian, English, Arabic, Italian
- License: GPLv3
- Website: launchpad.net/zakat-calc

Zakat Calc is an application for Linux. Zakat, or almsgiving, is one of the Five Pillars of Islam, is the giving of 2.5% of one's possessions (surplus wealth) to charity, generally to the poor and needy. Zakat Calc allows users to calculate zakat types: gold, silver, stones, jewels, savings in bank, property, loans, business, firms, animals (2.5%) and agriculture (10%). It was created in the Gambas programming language.

Gnome Nanny (parental control) serves as a way to control how long users or children can be on the computer and what they can and cannot access browsing the web.

== See also ==
- Free software
