= David Burt (filtering advocate) =

American content filtering advocate

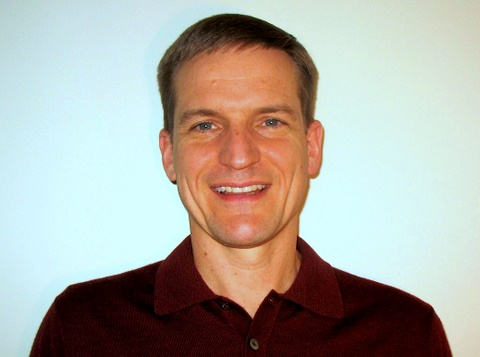

David Burt is a former librarian and a longtime advocate for content-control software. Burt's research on Internet filtering and the problems allegedly associated with unfiltered Internet access have been cited by both the United States Congress and the Supreme Court of the United States in upholding the Children's Internet Protection Act (CIPA). He is discussed in various sources such as the book Pornified.

== Early life and career ==
David Burt completed an undergraduate degree in history and a masters of library science from the University of Washington in 1992. He worked for the New York Public Library for three years, then worked at the Lake Oswego, Oregon Public Library as an information technology manager from 1996 to 2000. Since then he has worked with filtering software companies.

== Filtering Facts ==
In July 1997, his concerns about children potentially being exposed to pornography on the Internet led him to start Filtering Facts, a nonprofit organization that encouraged libraries to voluntarily adopt filters. Burt's advocacy included testifying as an expert witness in the library filtering case Mainstream Loudon v. Board in 1998; before the National Commission on Library and Information Science; as well as state legislatures, city councils, and local library boards. This activism was profiled in an article in The New York Times in 1999.

In 1999, Burt filed over 15,000 Freedom of Information Act (FOIA) requests of public libraries seeking public records documenting incidents involving Internet pornography in public libraries. Burt compiled the over 2,000 incidents into a report published by the Family Research Council entitled Dangerous Access 2000: Uncovering Pornography in America's Libraries The reports included news stories but also anecdotal, often second and third-hand, reports. Judith Krug, director of the American Library Association's Office for Intellectual Freedom, stated that the report was "inflammatory and sensational", based on an agenda "to control what everyone reads, views, and listens to."

Dangerous Access 2000 was entered into the Congressional Record in 2000 in support of the Children's Internet Protection Act (CIPA), a law Congress passed in 2000 requiring public libraries that receive certain types of federal funding to purchase filtering software.

== Filtering industry and CIPA ==
In March 2000, Burt closed Filtering Facts and accepted a job in marketing with the (now defunct) filtering company N2H2. While at N2H2, he testified before the Congressional Commission on Child Online Protection (COPA) in 2000 the Department of Commerce, and the U.S. Copyright Office in the 2003 DMCA exemption hearings

In 2001, the Department of Justice legal team charged with defending CIPA hired Burt as a consultant. Burt helped identify and recruit most of the witnesses used by the DOJ, and assisted the DOJ in depositions of opposing witnesses.

On June 23, 2003, the US Supreme Court upheld the constitutionality of CIPA, specifically citing Burt and Dangerous Access 2000 as justification for Congress passing CIPA:

Congress learned that adults us[e] library computers to access pornography that is then exposed to staff, passersby, and children, and that minors access child and adult pornography in libraries. Footnote 1,(citing D. Burt, Dangerous Access, 2000 Edition: Uncovering Internet Pornography in America's Libraries (2000)) (noting more than 2,000 incidents of patrons, both adults, and minors, using library computers to view online pornography, including obscenity and child pornography).

In 2003, N2H2 was acquired by Secure Computing, which hired Burt to promote Secure Computing's filtering and other network security products. In 2006, Burt left Secure Computing for his current position promoting network security products in Microsoft's Security and Access Services Division.

== Get Parental Controls ==
In 2007, Burt revived FilteringFacts.org. In 2010, FilteringFacts.org was replaced by GetParentalControls.org. "The purpose of GetParentalControls.org is to provide accurate, comprehensive, and unbiased information about parental control technology."
