= ThisAV =

Pornographic website

- Website type: Internet pornography
- Available in: Multilingual
- Founded: 2009
- Headquarters: Hong Kong
- Advertising: Yes
- Commercial: Yes
- Registration: Optional

ThisAV is an Internet pornography sharing website hosted in Hong Kong, first launched in 2009. The site mainly hosts contents in Chinese and Japanese; access is free-of-charge and a registration is optional but not required. The website served one million unique IP addresses per day, in 2015, according to its founder; about 15% and 60% of those IPs are from Hong Kong and Japan, respectively.

The site became temporarily inaccessible since January 2023, showing its domain name to be on sale when accessed. After its reactivation, the logo of "MissAV" is displayed instead of its typical one, when accessed from a mobile browser.

FANZA, a subsidiary of DMM.com, announced its acquisition of MissAV and ThisAV's .com domain name in January 2025. The company claimed to have taken over the site through legal actions.

== History ==
The founder self-identifies as a 1980s Hongkonger that started practicing web hosting since highschool. During the 2008 financial crisis and ensuing wave of unemployment, they looked for earning opportunities outside the job market. Thinking a pornography website may be popular, they started ThisAV in 2009.

The website's theme music, To You That I can't Forget, is created in collaboration with Hong Kongese band ToNick in 2011.

During the 2012 Moral and National Education controversy and the ensuing Scholarism movement, the website went offline for a day, on September 1, 2012. The website instead displayed a message, in support of the Scholarism movement, "the Hong Kong government should listen to those Scholarism kids and the 90,000 protesters on the streets". The website included a blue ribbon in its logo after the 2014 attack on reporter Kevin Lau. Later that year and during the Umbrella Movement, the website changed its logo to black-and-white overlaid by a yellow ribbon; it also posted an article mocking the 8·31 decision.

=== Legal actions ===
Screenshot of ThisAV.com in November 2026

In January 2025, a US regional court ruled against the owner of ThisAV in absentia, and requested the transfer of ownership for both missav and thisav's .com domain name to the Japanese corporation Will. That same month FANZA announced its takeover of the two domain name through legal actions. The website resumed its activities with a new domain name later that year.

In January 2025, FANZA, a subsidiary of DMM.com, announced that it had acquired the ".com" domain names of MissAV and ThisAV. The company claimed that it had seized these sites through legal action. Also in January 2025, FANZA announced the seizure of the ".com" domains for MissAV and ThisAV. In response, the sites continued operating under new domains. However, in April of the same year, "missav.ws" became temporarily inaccessible, and in early June, it was subjected to blocking measures again. In late June of that year, on the successor domain "missav.ai," a user-participation campaign (commonly referred to as "Genki-dama") reached 10 million participants. However, advertisements on the site were not removed. On October 30, 2025, it was reported that "missav123.com" and "missav.live" had become targets of filtering. At that time, "MissAV.ai" was still in operation. On November 18 of the same year, a large-scale outage at Cloudflare caused many sites, including MissAV.ai to go down temporarily, but they were restored the following day.

In 2026, on January 24, information spread that filtering on "missav.ws" and "missav123.com" had been lifted. Additionally, in March of the same year, filtering measures were implemented against "MISSAV.ws" in Taiwan as well, but similar to Japan, operations shifted to "missav.ai."
