= WebMinder =

WebMinder was a content blocking system implemented in the UK by Brightview Internet Services and used on their ISPs such as Madasafish, Global Internet and Waitrose.Com. It was similar in purpose to Cleanfeed, BT's blocking system and used a list from the Internet Watch Foundation. In addition to this it claimed to stop images from these sites being transmitted as email attachments.

WebMinder was a two-stage process using Cisco's Web Cache Communication Protocol version 2 (WCCPv2). and was architecturally similar to Cleanfeed.

WebMinder was retired after BT's purchase of the Brightview Group in 2007, and the ISP's using it were moved to BT's Cleanfeed system.
