= BlackSpider Technologies Limited =

Software company in United Kingdom

- Industry: software
- Founded: 2002
- Founder: John Cheney
- Successor: SurfControl (July 2006)
- Headquarters: Reading, Berkshire, United Kingdom
- Services: cloud computing services: * email spam * malware

BlackSpider Technologies Limited was a British software company founded in 2002 and subsequently acquired by SurfControl in July 2006.

The Company provided cloud computing services for filtering email spam and other malware.

== History ==
BlackSpider was a start-up company founded in 2002 by John Cheney in Reading, Berkshire, UK.

In January 2004 Casenove Private Equity invested £4.6m ($6.6m) in the business, allowing the organisation to grow into the French and German markets.

In July 2006 SurfControl, a UK listed PLC, acquired BlackSpider for £19.5m in cash.

At the point of acquisition BlackSpider had £4m in historic revenues, an operating loss of £3.1m and over 1,200 customers.

In October 2007 Websense acquired SurfControl for approximately £204m.

Following the acquisition of SurfControl by Websense, the original BlackSpider Management Team, including John Cheney, left to found Workbooks.com, a provider of web-based CRM software for small businesses.

== Products ==
MailControl was the brand name for BlackSpider Technologies email filtering services. These products are now sold by Forcepoint under the brand name Hosted Email Security.
