= ISheriff =

iSheriff
- Type: Private
- Industry: Information Security
- Founded: 1999
- Headquarters: Redwood City, California, United States
- Key people: Oscar G Marquez (CTO & founding member)
- Products: E-mail filtering, Web filters, Email Archiving, Endpoint Security; All products are cloud-based
- Website: www.isheriff.com

iSheriff (formerly Internet Sheriff) is an Internet security software vendor that specializes in cloud-based security and compliance, with specialties in E-mail filtering, Web filters and endpoint security. The company is privately held and based in Redwood City, California. iSheriff sells their products through partners and distributors.

== History ==
Founded in Brisbane, Australia in 1999 by Oscar Marquez, iSheriff products focused on content filtering, email and Web filtering software and appliances. In 2009 the company moved its products to a cloud computing service model. iSheriff services include e-mail filtering, web filtering, email archiving, e-mail encryption and security reporting. The company holds a patent for its data modeling engine based on Bayesian spam filtering principals.

In 2006, iSheriff provided Internet filtering software to the Tasmanian government's first statewide trial of anti-pornography filters for children.

In July 2012, Total Defense, Inc., a provider of cybercrime-fighting technology, announced they had acquired iSheriff. On April 21, 2014, Total Defense announced that, in conjunction with the sale of their consumer business unit to Untangle, they re-branded as iSheriff.

In November 2016, Mimecast announced that it had purchased substantially all of the assets of iSheriff. Mimecast was later acquired by private equity firm Permira for $5.8 billion.
