= Wordfilter =

Script used to censor words or phrases on the internet

A wordfilter (sometimes referred to as just "filter" or "censor") is a script typically used on Internet forums or chat rooms that automatically scans users' posts or comments as they are submitted and automatically changes or censors particular words or phrases.

The most basic wordfilters search only for specific strings of letters, and remove or overwrite them regardless of their context. More advanced wordfilters make some exceptions for context (such as filtering "butt" but not "butter"), and more advanced wordfilters may use regular expressions.

== Functions ==
Wordfilters can serve any of a number of functions.

=== Removal of vulgar language ===
A swear filter, also known as a profanity filter, obscenity filter or language filter is a software subsystem which modifies text to remove words deemed offensive by the administrator or community of an online forum. Swear filters are common in custom-programmed chat rooms and online video games, primarily MMORPGs. This is not to be confused with content filtering, which is usually built into internet browsing programs by third-party developers to filter or block specific websites or types of websites. Swear filters are usually created or implemented by the developers of the Internet service.

Most commonly, wordfilters are used to censor language considered inappropriate by the operators of the forum or chat room. Expletives are typically partially replaced, completely replaced, or replaced by nonsense words. This relieves the administrators or moderators of the task of constantly patrolling the board to watch for such language. This may also help the message board avoid content-control software installed on users' computers or networks, since such software often blocks access to Web pages that contain vulgar language.

Filtered phrases may be permanently replaced as it is saved (example: phpBB 1.x), or the original phrase may be saved but displayed as the censored text. In some software users can view the text behind the wordfilter by quoting the post.

Swear filters typically take advantage of string replacement functions built into the programming language used to create the program, to swap out a list of inappropriate words and phrases with a variety of alternatives. Alternatives can include:

- Grawlix nonsense characters, such as !@#$%^&*
- Replacing a certain letter with a shift-number character or a similar looking one.
- Asterisks or number signs (* or #) of either a set length, or the length of the original word being filtered. Alternatively, posters often replace certain letters with an asterisk.
- Popular minced oaths such as "heck", "frick", or "darn", or invented minced oaths such as "flum" or "flek".
- Family friendly words or phrases, or euphemisms, like "LOVE" or "I LOVE YOU", or completely different words which have nothing to do with the original word.
- Deletion of the post. In this case, the entire post is blocked and there is usually no way to fix it.
- Nothing at all or full blocks (█). In this case, the offending word is deleted or replaced with the full block symbol repeated in the length of the obscenity.

Some swear filters do a simple search for a string. Others have measures that ignore whitespace, and still others go as far as ignoring all non-alphanumeric characters and then filtering the plain text. This means that if the word "you" was set to be filtered, "y o u" or "y.o!u" would also be filtered.

=== Cliché control ===
Clichés—particular words or phrases constantly reused in posts, also known as "memes"—often develop on forums. Some users find that these clichés add to the fun, but other users find them tedious, especially when overused. Administrators may configure the wordfilter to replace the annoying cliché with a more embarrassing phrase, or remove it altogether.

=== Vandalism control ===
Internet forums are sometimes attacked by vandals who try to fill the forum with repeated nonsense messages, or by spammers who try to insert links to their commercial web sites. The site's wordfilter may be configured to remove the nonsense text used by the vandals, or to remove all links to particular websites from posts.

=== Lameness filter ===
Lameness filters are text-based wordfilters used by Slash-based websites (such as textboards and imageboards) to stop junk comments from being posted in response to stories. Some of the things they are designed to filter include:

- Too many capital letters
- Too much repetition
- ASCII art
- Comments which are too short or long
- Use of HTML tags that try to break web pages
- Comment titles consisting solely of "first post"
- Any occurrence of a word or term deemed (by the programmers) to be offensive/vulgar

=== Government censorship ===
The Chinese government censors some internet content, which is reflected in the chat feature of some online games. In 2017, a paper looked at over 180,000 unique blacklisted keywords in mobile games. Content policy plans are required to be submitted to regulators, but there is no centralized 'banned' keyword list provided by federal or even provincial authorities, so every developer and publisher may or may not allow different "edge cases". The flagging of innocuous language because of regex-based keyword lists is omnipresent whether in Latin or Chinese characters. This has prompted a Chinese internet slang culture that leans heavily on puns and intentional misspelling, such as the Baidu 10 Mythical Creatures.

== Circumventing filters ==
Since wordfilters are automated and look only for particular sequences of characters, users aware of the filters will sometimes try to circumvent them by changing their lettering just enough to avoid the filters. A user trying to avoid a vulgarity filter might replace one of the characters in the offending word into an asterisk, dash, or something similar. Some administrators respond by revising the wordfilters to catch common substitutions; others may make filter evasion a punishable offense of its own. A simple example of evading a wordfilter would be entering symbols between letters, deliberately misspelling words, or using leet. More advanced techniques of wordfilter evasion include the use of images, using hidden tags, or Cyrillic characters (i.e., a homograph spoofing attack).

Another method is to use a soft hyphen. A soft hyphen is only used to indicate where a word can be split when breaking text lines and is not displayed. By placing this halfway in a word, the word gets broken up and will in some cases not be recognised by the wordfilter.

Some more advanced filters, such as those in the online game RuneScape, can detect bypassing. However, the downside of sensitive wordfilters is that legitimate phrases get filtered out as well.

== Censorship aspects ==
Wordfilters are coded into the Internet forums or chat rooms, and operate only on material submitted to the forum or chat room in question. This distinguishes wordfilters from content-control software, which is typically installed on an end user's PC or computer network, and which can filter all Internet content sent to or from the PC or network in question. Since wordfilters alter users' words without their consent, some users still consider them to be censorship, while others consider them an acceptable part of a forum operator's right to control the contents of the forum.

== False positives ==
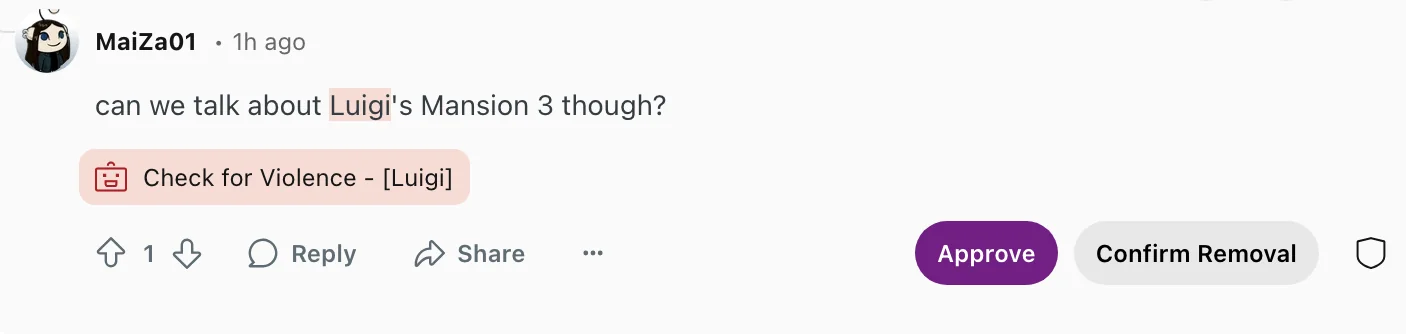
A comment about Luigi's Mansion 3 being falsely flagged as "violent" due to Reddit's flagging system misattributing the word "Luigi" to Luigi Mangione

A common quirk with wordfilters, often considered either comical or aggravating by users, is that they often affect words that are not intended to be filtered. This is a typical problem when short words are filtered. For example, with the word "ass" censored, one may see, "Do you need ***istance for playing cl***ical music?" instead of "Do you need assistance for playing classical music?" Multiple words may be filtered if whitespace is ignored, resulting in "as suspected" becoming "** *uspected". Prohibiting a phrase such as "hard on" will result in filtering innocuous statements such as "That was a hard one!" and "Sorry I was hard on you," into "That was a **** **e!" and "Sorry I was **** ** you."

Some words that have been filtered accidentally can become replacements for profane words. One example of this is found on the Myst forum Mystcommunity. There, the word 'manuscript' was accidentally censored for containing the word 'anus', which resulted in 'm****cript'. The word was adopted as a replacement swear and carried over when the forum moved, and many substitutes, such as " 'scripting ", are used (though mostly by the older community members).

Place names may be filtered out unintentionally due to containing portions of swear words. In the early years of the internet, the British place name Penistone was often filtered out from spam and swear filters.

== Implementation ==
Many games, such as World of Warcraft, and more recently, Habbo Hotel and RuneScape allow users to turn the filters off. Other games, especially free massively multiplayer online games, such as Knight Online do not have such an option.

Other games such as Medal of Honor and Call of Duty (except Call of Duty: World at War, Call of Duty: Black Ops, Call of Duty: Black Ops 2, and Call of Duty: Black Ops 3) do not give users the option to turn off scripted foul language, while Gears of War does.

In addition to games, profanity filters can be used to moderate user generated content in forums, blogs, social media apps, kid's websites, and product reviews. There are many profanity filter APIs like WebPurify that help in replacing the swear words with other characters (i.e., "@#$!"). These profanity filters APIs work with profanity search and replace method.

== See also ==
- Censorship by Google § Search suggestions
- Content-control software
- Grawlix
- Internet censorship
- Scunthorpe problem
