= Secure Web SmartFilter EDU =

Secure Web SmartFilter EDU, formerly known as Bess, is a brand of content-control software made by Secure Computing Corporation, which acquired maker N2H2 in 2003; it is usually used in libraries and schools. The main purpose of the system is as an Internet filter, blocking minors using the public computers from accessing web content deemed inappropriate by the local administrators of the system based on the Acceptable Use Policy of the organization. The system is not installed locally (on each individual computer workstation), but installs on the server between the users and the open Internet. This feature makes it harder to bypass, though it is not uncommon for students with more extensive computer knowledge to attempt to bypass the system. The system allows for teachers or administrators to temporarily bypass the system if they need to access blocked sites for educational purposes.

The system is compliant with the Children's Internet Protection Act. Like other similar filters, Secure Web SmartFilter EDU has come under attack for unnecessarily impeding school research (false positives), being too aggressive in its filtering procedures or not being aggressive enough in its filtering procedures. Other critics believe that the imposition of Internet filtering software without the consent of the user constitutes a violation of the First Amendment.

== See also ==
- Censorship
- Content-control software
- Internet censorship
- List of parental control software
