= NetGenie =

Internet connectivity device

- Industry: Networking, Computer Security
- Founded: 2011
- Products: Smart Wireless router for Home and Unified Threat Management for SOHO
- Parent: Cyberoam Technologies Pvt. Ltd.
- Website: www.netgenie.net

NetGenie is a wireless router part of Cyberoam's product portfolio, and was launched in 2011.

NetGenie provides Internet connectivity across all Internet-access devices like desktop, laptop, PDA, smartphones, tablets and other handheld devices.

== Product Range ==
NetGenie contains 4 basic products, two for home users (NG11VH and NG11EH) and two for SOHO users (NG11VO and NG11EO).

=== NG11VH ===
The NG11VH is a Wireless VDSL2 /ADSL2+ Modem Router and supports VDSL2, ADSL2+, Cable Internet, 3G USB modem connections.

=== NG11EH ===
The NG11EH model has parental control options for blocking unsafe/adult content (under lists of pornography, Spyware, nudity), customizable internet access, and reports on online activities that includes the relevant information about security on user's internet activities such as visited websites, used online applications, and attempts to visit blocked websites.

=== NG11VO ===
The NG11VO is a Wireless VDSL2/ADSL2+ Integrated Security Appliance for small offices. It supports VDSL2, ADSL2+, Cable Internet, 3G USB modem connections. The NG11VO comes with pre-configured security against unauthorized access and misuse of office Wi-Fi network(s).

=== NG11EO ===
The NG11EO is for small or home offices and can be managed through a web-based GUI, available over any internet connected device within the office network. Features include security, VPN, 3G ready, internal controls, pre-configured Wi-Fi Security, reports, and remote management.

== See also ==
- Wireless router
- Unified Threat Management
- Network Security
