= Norton ConnectSafe =

Norton ConnectSafe was a free public DNS service offered by Symantec Corporation that claimed to offer a faster and more reliable web browsing experience while blocking undesirable websites. The service was retired on November 15, 2018.

== History ==
The service was opened to the public in June 2010. Norton ConnectSafe retirement has been announced and is planned to occur November 15, 2018.

== Functionality ==
It provides protection from web threats in three protection policies. It automatically blocks known unsafe, fraudulent, phishing and infected websites which can cause harm to a device. It also blocks unwanted content, which is not suitable for children. Users can use Norton ConnectSafe by setting their DNS server addresses to those of the Norton ConnectSafe servers. Client software for Windows, Mac OS X, and Android is available to automatically configure devices to use Norton ConnectSafe.

DNS queries routed through Norton ConnectSafe are checked using the Norton Safe Web database to ensure that they do not point to malicious or inappropriate websites. Symantec thus seeks to block malware and phishing attempts, as well as pornographic and inappropriate websites if the user desires. Norton ConnectSafe will also intercept misspelled domain names and offer suggestions or display advertising. This redirection breaks some non-Web applications that rely on getting an NXDOMAIN response for non-existent domains.

== IPv4 addresses ==
The following addresses are registered to Norton ConnectSafe:

Policy A — Security
This policy blocks all sites hosting malware, phishing sites, and scam sites. To choose Policy A, use the following IP addresses as preferred and alternate DNS server addresses:

- 199.85.126.10
- 199.85.127.10

Policy B — Security + Pornography
In addition to blocking unsafe sites, this policy also blocks access to sites that contain sexually explicit material. To choose Policy B, use the following IP addresses as preferred and alternate DNS server addresses:

- 199.85.126.20
- 199.85.127.20

Policy C — Security + Pornography + Non-Family Friendly
This policy is ideal for families with young children. In addition to blocking unsafe sites and pornography sites, this policy also blocks access to sites that feature mature content, abortion, alcohol, crime, cults, drugs, gambling, hate, sexual orientation, suicide, tobacco, or violence. To choose Policy C, use the following IP addresses as preferred and alternate DNS server addresses

- 199.85.126.30
- 199.85.127.30

== See also ==
- Domain Name System
- Public recursive name server
- Name server
- OpenDNS
- Google Public DNS
- Quad9
