= Cupertino effect =

Software bug in a spell checker

The Cupertino effect occurs when a spell checker erroneously replaces correctly spelled words that are not in its dictionary.

== Origin ==
This term refers to the unhyphenated English word "cooperation" often being changed to "Cupertino" by older spell checkers, with dictionaries containing only the hyphenated variant, "co-operation". Cupertino is a city in California, and its name is often used as a metonym for Apple Inc., as the firm's corporate headquarters is located in the city.

"Cupertino" has been in the dictionaries used by Microsoft Word since at least 1989. Lack of vigilance in post-spell check editing can result in even official documents containing phrases such as "South Asian Association for Regional Cupertino" and "presentation on African-German Cupertino".

== Other examples ==
Benjamin Zimmer at the University of Pennsylvania collected many examples of similar errors, including the common replacement of "definately" (misspelling of "definitely") with "defiantly", "DeMeco Ryans" with "Demerol" (in The New York Times), "Voldemort" with "Voltmeter" (Denver Post), and the "Muttahida Qaumi Movement" being replaced with "Muttonhead Quail Movement" (Reuters).

The user need not always select an incorrect word for it to appear in the document. In WordPerfect 9 with factory default settings, any unrecognized word that was close enough to exactly one known word was automatically replaced with that word. Current versions of Microsoft Word come configured to "auto-correct" misspelled words silently as the user types. Smartphones with dictionary-supported virtual keyboards automatically replace possible mistakes with dictionary words. (Auto-correction can be disabled by the user.)

== See also ==
- Textonyms – words with the same keypad sequence which may thus be confused in an SMS text.
- Scunthorpe problem – false positives in obscenity filters
