= Pumpic =

Parental mobile monitoring service

- Stable release: 19 (iOS), 21 (Android) / April 22, 2016
- Written in: Objective C (iOS), Java (Android)
- Operating system: iOS, Android
- Size: 10MB
- Available in: English
- License: EULA
- Website: Pumpic Homepage

Pumpic is a parental mobile monitoring service launched in 2012. The company develops and supports mobile and tablet monitoring software compatible with iOS and Android platforms. Pumpic application was initially created for parents or guardians to monitor and control activities on their kids' devices. It has many customer support resources and a variety of alerts and restrictions parents can set on their child's device. The monitoring and controlling features are available from a PC, smartphone or tablet after installing the application on the target device.

== Features ==
Pumpic application has more than 20 features. It allows parents to monitor text messages, call history, contacts, emails, and popular messaging apps including Kik, WhatsApp, and Snapchat. Here is the list of all features.

Feature	Android 2.2 - 6.0.1	iOS (iCloud) 6.0 - 10.2
Calls history	+	+
Block device	+	-
Calls blocking	+	-
SMS blocking	+	-
SMS limiting	+	-
Location history	+	+
Geo-fences	+	-
Contacts	+	+
Calendar	+	+
Notes	-	+
Browsing history	+	+
Websites blocking	+	-
Bookmarks	+	+
Photos	+	+
Emails	+	+
Applications Management	+	-
Videos	+	-
WhatsApp	+	+
Skype	+	+
Viber	+	-
Kik	+	+
Instagram	+	-
Snapchat	+	-
Facebook	+	-
Keylogger	+	-

== Reviews ==
- App Advice
- Huffington Post
- Top Ten Reviews
- Android Guys
- iOS Hacker
