= Consortium for School Networking =

American nonprofit organization

The Consortium for School Networking (CoSN) is a member-based association and advocacy group based in Washington, DC, United States, that promotes partnerships and awareness of emerging technologies amongst technology decision-makers in K-12 education.

== History ==
CoSN, formed in 1992, is the premier professional association for K-12 EdTech leaders, their teams, other school district leaders, and represents over 13 million students. CoSN provides thought leadership resources, community, best practices, and advocacy tools to help leaders succeed at digital transformation.

In the early years, CoSN became part of a coalition which advocated for the 1997 enactment of E-rate, a component of the Universal Service Fund, which provides discounts to assist most schools and libraries in the United States (and U.S. territories) to obtain affordable telecommunications and Internet access. Since then, CoSN has since continued its advocacy for the program and has become a powerful and influential voice in K-12 education.

CoSN also provides opportunities for companies that support the K-12 EdTech community to participate as corporate members.

CoSN also played a leading role in advocating for sound technology policies within the 2001 reauthorization of the Elementary and Secondary Education Act (ESEA).
