= Scunthorpe problem =

Problem caused by profanity filters on the Internet

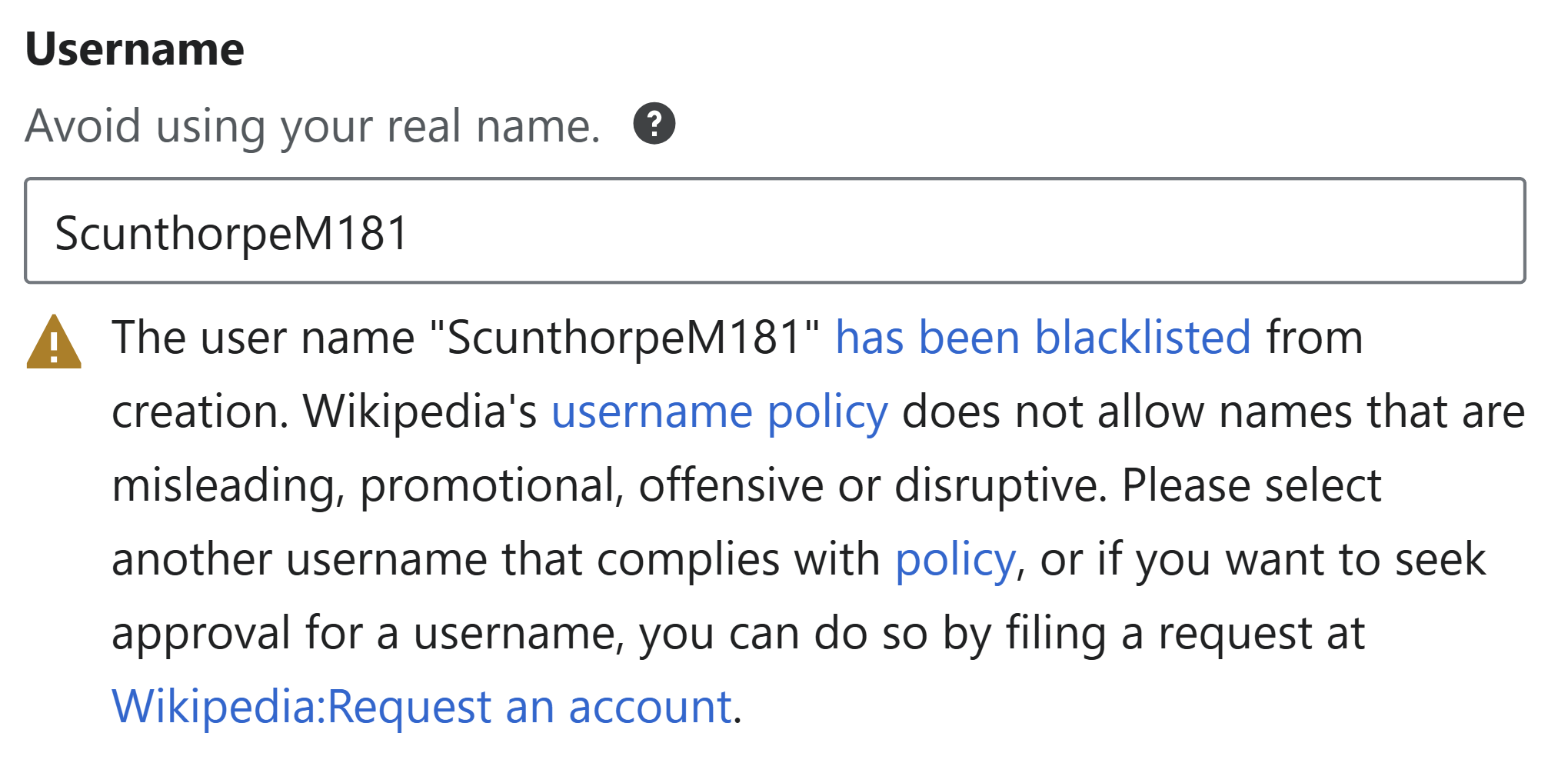
An example of the Scunthorpe problem in Wikipedia because of a regular expression identifying cunt in the username

The Scunthorpe problem is the unintentional blocking of online content by a spam filter, search engine or wordfilter because the text contains a string (or substring) of letters that appear to have an obscene or otherwise unacceptable meaning. Names, abbreviations, and technical terms are most often cited as being affected by the issue.

The problem arises since computers can easily identify strings of text within a document, but interpreting words of this kind requires considerable ability to interpret a wide range of contexts, possibly across many cultures, which is an extremely difficult task. As a result, broad blocking rules may result in false positives affecting many innocent phrases.

== Etymology and origin ==
The problem was named after an incident in April 1996 in which AOL's profanity filter prevented people in the English town of Scunthorpe from creating AOL accounts because the town's name contains the substring cunt. In the early 2000s, Google's opt-in SafeSearch made the same error, with local services and businesses that included the town in their names or URLs among those mistakenly hidden from search results.

== Workarounds ==
The Scunthorpe problem is challenging to completely solve due to the difficulty of creating a filter capable of understanding words in context.

One solution involves creating a whitelist of known false positives. Any word appearing on the whitelist can be ignored by the filter, even though it contains text that would otherwise not be allowed.

== Other examples ==
Mistaken decisions by obscenity filters include:

=== Refused web domain names and account registrations ===
- In April 1998, Jeff Gold attempted to register the domain name shitakemushrooms.com, but due to the substring shit, he was blocked by an InterNIC filter prohibiting the "seven dirty words". (Shiitake, also commonly spelled shitake, is the Japanese name for the edible fungus Lentinula edodes.)
- In 2000, a Canadian television news story on web filtering software found that the website for the Montreal Urban Community (French: Communauté Urbaine de Montréal) was entirely blocked because its domain name was its French acronym CUM (www.cum.qc.ca); "cum" (among other meanings) is an English-language vulgar slang term for semen.
- In February 2004 in Scotland, Craig Cockburn reported that he was unable to use his surname (pronounced "Coburn", IPA: /ˈkoʊbərn/) with Hotmail because it contains the substring cock, a slang word for the penis. Separately, he had problems with his workplace email because his job title, software specialist, contained the substring Cialis, an erectile dysfunction medication commonly mentioned in spam e-mails. Hotmail initially told him to spell his name C0ckburn (with a zero instead of the letter o) but later reversed the ban. In 2010, he had a similar problem registering on the BBC website, where again the first four characters of his surname caused a problem for the content filter.
- In July 2008, Herman I. Libshitz was unable to register an e-mail address containing his name with Verizon because his surname contained the substring shit, and Verizon initially rejected his request for an exception. In a subsequent statement, a Verizon spokeswoman apologised for not approving his desired e-mail address.

=== Blocked web searches ===
- In the months leading up to January 1996, some web searches for Super Bowl XXX were being filtered, because the Roman numeral for the game is also used to identify pornography.
- Gareth Roelofse, the web designer for RomansInSussex.co.uk, noted in 2004: "We found many library Net stations, school networks and Internet cafes block sites with the word 'sex' in the domain name. This was a challenge for RomansInSussex.co.uk because its target audience is school children."
- In German, a linking letter is used in compound words to represent the genitive case of the first of two linked words. For example, in Geburtstag, which means birthday, the compound is built up by connecting the phrase der Geburt Tag, adding a linking s in between. In cases where the second word starts with ex-, this way of compounding long words results in the substring sex, which is said to be triggering search engine block filter lists, famously so in the word Staatsexamen.
- In 2008, the filter of the free wireless service of the town of Whakatāne in New Zealand blocked searches involving the town's own name because the filter's phonetic analysis deemed the whak to sound like fuck; the town name is in Māori, and in the Māori language, wh is most commonly pronounced /f/. The town subsequently put the town name on the filter's whitelist.
- In July 2011, web searches in China on the name Jiang were blocked following claims on the Weibo microblogging site that former Chinese Communist Party (CCP) general secretary Jiang Zemin had died. Since the word Jiang meaning "river" is written with the same Chinese character (江), searches related to rivers including the Yangtze (Cháng Jiāng) produced the message: "According to the relevant laws, regulations and policies, the results of this search cannot be displayed."
- In February 2018, web searches on Google's shopping platform were blocked for items such as glue guns, Guns N' Roses, and Burgundy wine after Google hastily patched its search system after it displayed results for weapons and accessories that violated Google's stated policies.

=== Blocked emails ===
- In 2001, Yahoo! Mail introduced an email filter which automatically replaced JavaScript-related strings with alternative versions, to prevent the possibility of cross-site scripting in HTML email. The filter would hyphenate the terms JavaScript, JScript, VBScript and LiveScript; and replaced eval, mocha and expression with the similar but not quite synonymous terms review, espresso and statement, respectively. Assumptions were involved in the writing of the filters: no attempts were made to limit these string replacements to script sections and attributes, or to respect word boundaries, in case this would leave some loopholes open. This resulted in such errors as medireview in place of medieval.
- In February 2003, Members of Parliament at the British House of Commons found that a new spam filter was blocking emails containing references to the Sexual Offences Bill then under debate, as well as some messages relating to a Liberal Democrat consultation paper on censorship. It also blocked emails sent in Welsh because it did not recognise the language.
- In October 2004, it was reported that the Horniman Museum in London was failing to receive some of its email because filters mistakenly treated its name as a version of the words horny man.

=== Blocked for words with multiple meanings ===
- In October 2004, e-mails advertising the pantomime Dick Whittington sent to schools in the UK were blocked by school computers because of the use of the name Dick, sometimes used as slang for penis.
- In May 2006, a man in Manchester in the UK found that e-mails he wrote to his local council to complain about a planning application had been blocked as they contained the word erection when referring to a structure.
- Blocked e-mails and web searches relating to The Beaver, a magazine based in Winnipeg, caused the publisher to change its name to Canada's History in 2010, after 89 years of publication. Publisher Deborah Morrison commented: "Back in 1920, The Beaver was a perfectly appropriate name. And while its other meaning [vulva] is nothing new, its ambiguity began to pose a whole new challenge with the advance of the Internet. The name became an impediment to our growth".
- In 2011, a councillor in Dudley found an email flagged for profanity by his council's security software after mentioning the Black Country dish faggots (a type of meatball, but also a pejorative term for gay men). Likewise, in November 2013, Facebook temporarily blocked British users for using the word faggot in reference to the dish.
- Residents of Penistone in South Yorkshire have had e-mails blocked because the town's name includes the substring penis.
- Residents of Clitheroe (Lancashire, England) have been repeatedly inconvenienced because their town's name includes the substring clit, which is short for clitoris.
- Résumés containing references to graduating with Latin honors such as cum laude, magna cum laude, and summa cum laude have been blocked by spam filters because of inclusion of the word cum, which is Latin for 'with' (in this usage), but is sometimes used as slang for semen or ejaculation in English usage. Likewise, in May 2018, the website of the grocery store Publix would not allow a cake to be ordered containing the phrase summa cum laude. The customer attempted to rectify the problem by including special instructions, but still ended up with a cake reading "Summa --- Laude".
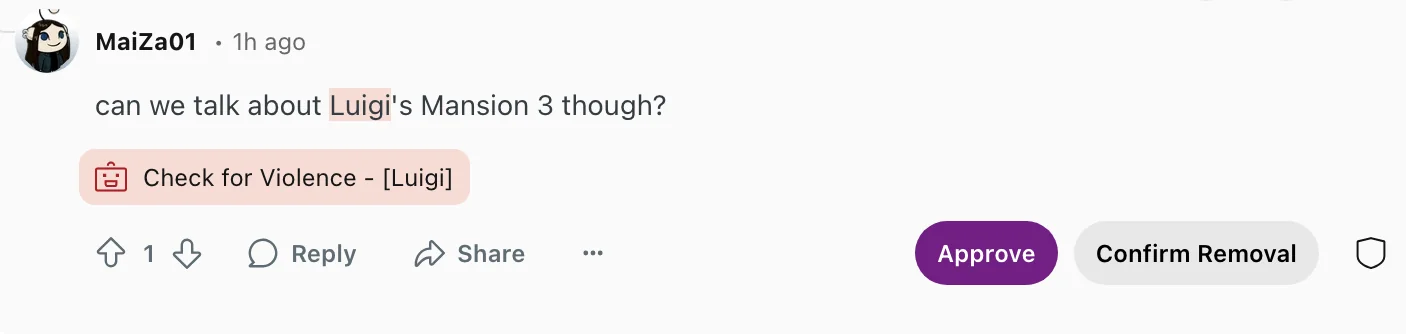
- The Reddit moderation system flagging the name "Luigi" as needing a "check for violence"
  A Reddit moderator alleged in March 2025 that the platform's automatic moderation system has been flagging posts that mentioned the name Luigi. The moderator, who noted it flagging a post about the video game Luigi's Mansion 3, believed it to be part of Reddit's "automod" feature for forums with few active human moderators, and the software regarded Luigi as being among words which "could – but don't necessarily – indicate violating content" in reference to Luigi Mangione, the suspect in the assassination of United Healthcare CEO Brian Thompson.

=== Video games ===
- In 2010, Microsoft banned an Xbox Live player named Josh Moore for stating he lived in Fort Gay, West Virginia, mistakenly deeming his profile offensive. Although he tried to clarify the situation, Xbox initially upheld the decision and warned of a possible permanent ban. The suspension lasted several days, causing him to miss a Call of Duty: Modern Warfare 2 Search and Destroy tournament. It took an appeal from Mayor David Thompson and media coverage for the issue to finally be corrected.
- In January 2014, files used in the online game League of Legends were reportedly blocked by some UK Internet service provider filters due to the names "VarusExpirationTimer.luaobj" and "XerathMageChainsExtended.luaobj", which contain the substring sex. This was later corrected.

=== Other ===
- In June 2008, the news site OneNewsNow, run by the anti-LGBTQ lobby group American Family Association, replaced instances of gay in an Associated Press article on sprinter Tyson Gay with homosexual, rendering his name as "Tyson Homosexual". This same function had previously changed the name of basketball player Rudy Gay to "Rudy Homosexual".
- Similarly, in 2015, on the 70th anniversary of the atomic bombing of Hiroshima, the Observer Chronicle referred to the Enola Gay as the "Enola Homosexual". In March 2025, the United States Department of Defense also erroneously removed references to the Enola Gay as part of a purge of diversity, equity and inclusion content ordered by Defense Secretary Pete Hegseth.
- In 2013, file transfers named for the Swedish city of Falun caused web connection outages at Diakrit, a firm based in China. Diakrit resolved the issue by renaming the files. Fredrik Bergman of Diakrit believes that the file names triggered the Great Firewall's censors used to block discussion of Falun Gong, a banned religious movement founded in China.
- In May 2020, despite extensive media scrutiny, some hashtags directly referring to British political advisor Dominic Cummings were unable to trend on Twitter because the substring cum triggered an anti-porn filter.
- In October 2020, a paleontology conference's virtual meeting platform blocked various words including bone, pubic, and stream.
- In January 2021, Facebook apologised for muting and banning users after it had erroneously flagged the Devon landmark Plymouth Hoe as misogynistic.
- In April 2021, the official Facebook page for the French Commune of Bitche was taken down. In response, commune officials created a new page referencing instead the postal code, Mairie 57230. Facebook later apologised and restored the original page. As a precaution, the officials of Rohrbach-lès-Bitche renamed their Facebook page Ville de Rohrbach.
- In April 2024, Facebook pages containing the abbreviation CP were blocked from searches and in some cases deactivated, due to filters relating to child exploitation, recognising CP as "child pornography". Cerebral Palsy charity "CP Teens UK" had their page deactivated for a year, severely affecting their ability to operate.
- The word or string ass may be replaced by butt, resulting in clbuttic for classic, clbuttroom for classroom, buttignment for assignment, and buttbuttinate for assassinate. Saying something was a clbuttic mistake – a filter block of ass in classic mistake – is used online to humorously point out instances of the Scunthorpe problem happening.
- In October 2026, Chaosium cited the Scunthorpe problem as a primary reason for renaming the Cthulhu Mythos god "Shub-Niggurath" to "Shub-Gorath" in their upcoming products, claiming that automatic content filters were flagging it as containing the racial slur nigger.

== See also ==
- Censorship by Google
- Cupertino effect – Software bug in a spell checker
- False positive – Types of error in data reporting
- Predictive text – Input technology for mobile phone keypads
- Rebracketing – Process in historical linguistics
- Spam detection – Methods to prevent email spam
- String substitution – Process of replacing substrings
- Wordfilter – Script used to censor words or phrases on the internet
