= DansGuardian =

Content-control software

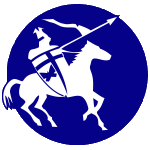
- Original author(s): Daniel Barron
- Developer(s): Aecio F. Neto
- Stable release: 2.10.1.1 / June 2009; 16 years ago
- Preview release: 2.12.0.7.1 / 28 June 2013; 12 years ago
- Repository: sourceforge.net/p/dansguardian/code/HEAD/tree/
- Written in: C++
- Operating system: Unix-like (although E2Guardian can be installed and run natively on Windows 10 using the Windows Subsystem for Linux
- Size: 1 MB
- Type: Content-control software
- License: GPLv2 or proprietary license
- Website: dansguardian.org
- As of: December 2016

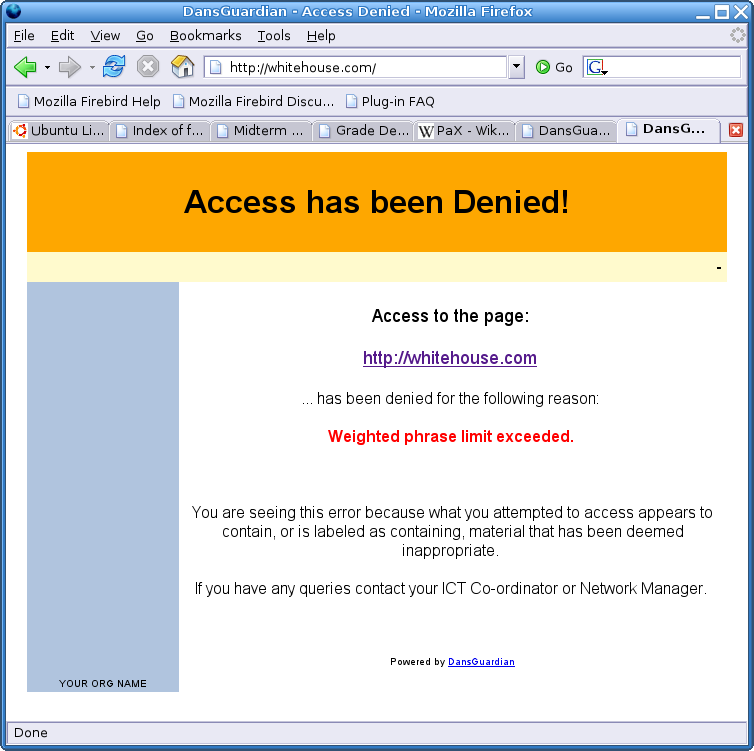
An example of the default DansGuardian blocking message.

DansGuardian, written by SmoothWall Ltd and others, is content-control software: software designed to control which websites users can access. It also includes virus filtering and usage monitoring features. DansGuardian must be installed on a Unix or Linux computer, such as a server computer; its filtering extends to all computers in an organization, including Windows and Macintosh computers. DansGuardian is used by schools, businesses, value-added Internet service providers, and others.

As of now, DansGuardian is no longer maintained. Its successor is named "e2guardian".

== Technical details ==
DansGuardian is distributed under the GPLv2 free software license, and written using the C++ programming language. It primarily runs in Linux and other Unixes. It is entirely command line and web-based, and meant to be used in conjunction with a web proxy such as Squid.

=== Graphical configuration tools ===
The Ubuntu Christian Edition Linux distribution includes a graphical user interface (GUI) tool for configuring DansGuardian. The tool does not work as well as the configuration tools included with SmoothWall Guardian, and other web filters.

Zentyal has the option to use Dansguardian as a proxy server with a web interface.

There is a graphical user interface available for Ubuntu, called WebContentControl, which was designed to install and configure DansGuardian, FireHOL and Tinyproxy easily. WebContentControl is no longer maintained.

=== Blocklist Sources ===
The url filtering capabilities of DansGuardian depend largely on the Blocklists, several options are available. Gratis lists can be found at Shallalist.de, Université Toulouse 1 Capitole and commercial lists could be found at Squidblacklist.org.

== Legal details ==
In the United States, DansGuardian satisfies the requirements of Children's Internet Protection Act.

== Proprietary versions ==
Two proprietary versions of DansGuardian exist: as part of SmoothWall Limited Firewalls and as stand-alone product Smoothwall SWG.

== Forks ==
There exists a fork of Dansguardian Project called MinD. Its name is a recursive acronym for "MinD is not Dansguardian". The "Toy" version of MinD is a fork of DansGuardian version 2.10.1.1 with some improvements. MinD development began in July 2010, but stalled in December 2011.

A fork of Dansguardian with many improvements and bug fixes, e2Guardian is a web content filtering proxy that works in conjunction with another caching proxy such as Squid or Oops. This project was initiated by Frédéric Bourgeois and E2bn.
