= Parental controls =

Software feature allowing content filtering

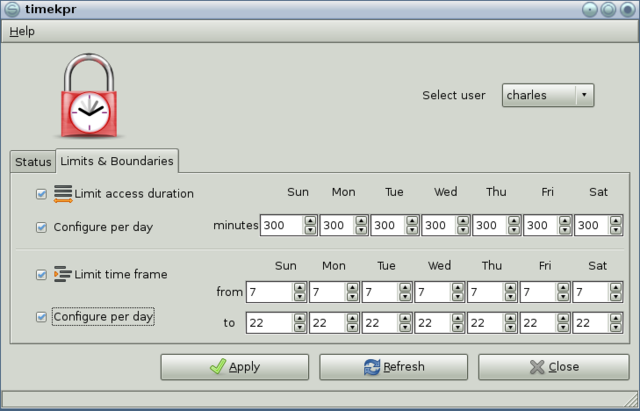
TimeKpr, a Linux app controlling how long the computer can be used per day.

Parental controls are features which may be included in digital television services, computers and video games, mobile devices and software to enable parents to restrict certain content viewable by their children. This may be content they deem inappropriate for their age, maturity level or feel is aimed more at an adult audience. Parental controls fall into roughly four categories: content filters, which limit access to age inappropriate content; usage controls, which constrain the usage of these devices such as placing time-limits on usage or forbidding certain types of usage; computer usage management tools, which enforces the use of certain software; and monitoring, which can track location and activity when using the devices.

Content filters were the first popular type of parental controls to limit access to Internet content. Television stations also began to introduce V-Chip technology to limit access to television content. Modern usage controls are able to restrict a range of explicit content such as explicit songs and movies. They are also able to turn devices off during specific times of the day, limiting the volume output of devices, and with GPS technology becoming affordable, it is now possible to easily locate devices such as mobile phones. UNICEF emphases the responsibility of parents and teachers in this role.

The demand for parental control methods that restrict content has increased over the decades due to the rising availability of the Internet. A 2014 ICM survey showed that almost a quarter of people under the age of 12 had been exposed to online pornography. Restricting especially helps in cases when children are exposed to inappropriate content by accident. Monitoring may be effective for lessening acts of cyberbullying within the internet. It is unclear whether parental controls will affect online harassment in children, as little is known about the role the family plays in protecting children from undesirable experiences online. Psychologically, cyberbullying could be more harmful to the victim than traditional bullying. Studies done in the past have shown that about 75% of adolescents were subjected to cyberbullying. A lack of parental controls in the household could enable kids to be a part of cyberbullying or be the victim of cyberbullying.

== Overview ==
Behavioral control consists of controlling the amount of time a child spends online, or how much the child can view. Psychological control involves parents trying to influence children's behavior.

Several techniques exist for creating parental controls for blocking websites. Add-on parental control software may monitor API in order to observe applications such as a web browser or Internet chat application and to intervene according to certain criteria, such as a match in a database of banned words. Virtually all parental control software includes a password or other form of authentication to prevent unauthorized users from disabling it.

Techniques involving a proxy server are also used. A web browser is set to send requests for web content to the proxy server rather than directly to the web server intended. The proxy server then fetches the web page from the server on the browser's behalf and passes on the content to the browser. Proxy servers can inspect the data being sent and received and intervene depending on various criteria relating to content of the page or the URL being requested, for example, using a database of banned words or banned URLs. The proxy method's major disadvantage is that it requires that the client application to be configured to utilize the proxy, and if it is possible for the user to reconfigure applications to access the Internet directly rather than going through the proxy, then this control is easily bypassed. Proxy servers themselves may be used to circumvent parental controls. There are other techniques used to bypass parental controls.

The computer usage management method, unlike content filters, is focused on empowering the parents to balance the computing environment for children by regulating gaming. The main idea of these applications is to allow parents to introduce a learning component into the computing time of children, who must earn gaming time while working through educational contents.

Network-based parental control devices have been develop which work as a firewall router using packet filtering, DNS response policy zone (RPZ) and deep packet inspection (DPI) methods to block inappropriate web content. These methods have been used in commercial and governmental communication networks. Another form of these devices made for home networks has been developed. These devices plug into the home router and create a new wireless network, which is specifically designed for kids to connect to.

== Parental controls on mobile devices ==
There are applications on mobile devices that allow parents to monitor real-time conversations on their children's phone via access to text messages, browser history, and application history. An example of one of these is Trend Micro which not only offers protection from viruses, but also offers parental controls to phones and tablets of almost all brands, like Apple or Android. Most of these offer the ability to add extra features to parental controls. These apps have the features mobile devices already have, but have additional features such as, being able to monitor and filter texts/calls, protection while surfing the web, and denied access to specific websites. Applications of this sort have created a rising competition in their market.

Mobile device software enables parents to restrict which applications their child can access while also allowing parents to monitor text messages, phone logs, MMS pictures, and other transactions occurring on their child's mobile device; to enable parents to set a time limit on the usage of mobile devices; and to track the exact location of their children as well as monitor calls and the content of texts. This software also allows parents to monitor social media accounts. Parents are able to view posts, pictures, and any interactions in real time. Another function of this software is to keep track of bullying.

Most internet service providers offer no-cost filtering options to limit internet browsing options and block unsuitable content. Implementing parental controls and discussing internet safety are useful steps to protect children from inappropriate information.

Although parental controls can protect children, they also come with some negative factors. Children's anxiety may increase due to parental controls. In extreme cases, a child may become so angry that they destroy their device, defeating the purpose of parental controls entirely. In that case, it might be a better idea to forgo installing parental controls.

== Bypassing parental controls ==
There are various ways that parental controls can be bypassed.

- If the filtering software is located locally within the computer, all Internet software can be easily bypassed by booting up the computer in question from alternative media, with an alternative operating system or (on Windows) in Safe Mode. However, if the computer's BIOS is configured to disallow booting from removable media, and if changes to the BIOS are prohibited without proper authentication, then booting into an alternative operating system is not available without circumventing BIOS security by partially disassembling the computer and resetting BIOS configuration using a button or jumper, or removing and replacing the internal button cell battery.
- Using external proxy servers or other servers. The user sends requests to the external server which retrieves content on the user's behalf. Filtering software may then never be able to know which URLs the user is accessing, as all communications are with the one external server and filtering software never sees any communications with the web servers from which content really originated. To counter this, filtering software may also block access to popular proxies. Additionally, filtering systems which only permit access to a set of allowed URLs (whitelisting) will not permit access anything outside this list, including proxy servers.
- Resetting passwords using exploits.
- Change the time and date.
- Modifying the software's files.
- Brute-force attacks on software passwords.
- 'Incognito/InPrivate' modes with the 'image' tab: Users, parental control software, and parental control routers may use 'safe search' (SafeSearch) to enforce filtering at most major search engines. However, in most browsers a user may select 'Incognito' or 'InPrivate' browsing, enter search terms for content, and select the 'image' tab to effectively bypass 'safe search' and many parental control filters. See below for router based considerations and solutions.
- WebView browsers: Some applications have WebView browsers embedded into them, which can be used to access web pages freely, since WebView browsers are rarely affected by parental controls.

Filtering that occurs outside of the individuals computer (such as at the router) cannot be bypassed using the above methods (except for 'Incognito/InPrivate' modes). However,

- The major search engines cache and serve content on their own servers. As a result, domain filters such as many third party DNS servers, also fail to filter the 'Incognito/InPrivate' with 'image' tab.
- Most commercially available routers with parental controls do not enforce safe search at the router, and therefore do not filter the 'Incognito/InPrivate' with 'image' tab.

== Criticism ==
While parental controls have been added to various electronic media and have increased in popularity, the question has been raised if they are enough to protect and deter children from exposure to inappropriate material. Penn State researchers speculated that the strict focus on control may hinder a child's ability to learn self-governing skills and restricting the growth of open communication between parent and child.

== Operating systems with parental controls ==
Below is a list of popular operating systems which currently have built-in parental control features:

- Android operating system
- iOS (12 or later)
- macOS (10.3 and later)
- DoudouLinux (built-in web filter)
- sabily (built-in web filter)
- Ubuntu Christian edition (built-in web filter)
- Windows (Vista, 7, 10 and later)
- ChromeOS (65 or later)

== See also ==
- Adultism
- David Burt
- Internet censorship
- Internet filter
- List of parental control software
- Motion picture rating system
- Television rating system
- Videogame Rating Council
- Retina-X Studios
- Smart Sheriff
- Restricted to Adults
