= Retina-X Studios =

Software manufacturing company based in Florida, USA

Retina-X Studios, LLC.
- Type: Limited liability company
- Industry: Software
- Founded: 1997; 29 years ago
- Headquarters: Jacksonville, Florida, United States
- Products: Monitoring software for computer and mobile devices
- Website: retinax.com

Retina-X Studios was an American software manufacturer company that developed computer and cell phone monitoring applications for computers, smartphones, tablets and networks. The company was founded in 1997 and was based in Jacksonville, Florida.

== History ==
The company was founded in July 1997 primarily as a web consulting and design company. In 2003, after a period of developing monitoring products for outside companies, the company began creating monitoring software products using its own brand name. The first software product, named AceSpy, was released on April 28, 2003.

In May 2007, the company developed and released monitoring software for mobile phones, named Mobile-Spy, particularly for Windows Mobile. In May 2009, the company announced version 3.0 of Mobile Spy for the Apple iPhone. In October 2009, Mobile Spy was released for BlackBerry devices. A 2012 investigation by Vulnerability Lab found that Mobile Spy contained multiple security flaws that allowed attackers to inject malicious code via SMS and potentially hijack a user’s monitoring session. Researchers warned that the vulnerabilities - affecting versions marketed for iPhone, Android, BlackBerry, and Windows Phone - made the app an attractive target for exploitation, raising significant concerns about the security of those using the spyware.

In March 2018, Retina-X Studios suspended all of its monitoring products, including PhoneSheriff, TeenShield, SniperSpy and Mobile Spy, following a series of security breaches. A hacker had repeatedly accessed the company’s servers in 2017 and 2018, exposing customer data and files associated with its consumer surveillance applications. After the second breach was reported, the company acknowledged the intrusion and announced that services would be "immediately and indefinitely" halted, offering pro-rated refunds to affected customers.

== Usage ==
Target audiences for Retina-X Studios are parents and employers.

=== Legal ===
Parents and employers use legal monitoring software to check their teens' and staff's internet use. Company markets its products as spy applications as parents can review child's messages and call details without the child's knowledge. Ethical issues can arise if employees are not made aware of monitoring tools, if personal emails are intentionally accessed and if managers are involved directly in evaluating the contents of logging activities as they can be/become biased towards the person whose email is being reviewed.

=== Illegal ===
Using cell phones for spying has also increased due to multiplication of smart phones and compromising one's information is very possible with spy apps. People can stalk each other easily with company software. All they need is a onetime access to the gadget and then such software would run invisibly. The wrong use of the software should not be overlooked. The hackers can access the online information that is parsed to the customer's account and this can lead to privacy issues.

== See also ==
- Phone surveillance
- Employee monitoring software
- Keystroke logging
