= SurfControl =

SurfControl Plc (formerly JSB Software Technologies PLC)
- Type: Subsidiary
- Industry: Internet filtering Desktop security
- Founded: 1997
- Headquarters: Congleton, Cheshire, England
- Key people: Founders Steve Purdham and Rob Barrow, Patricia Sueltz, Chief Executive Officer; Greg Lock Non-Executive Chairman; Syed Imran, Non-Executive Director; Simon Wilson, Chief Financial Officer; George Hayter, Senior Non-Executive Director; Jane Tozer, Non-Executive Director; Rene Schuster, Non-Executive Director
- Products: Web filter, Email Filter, Enterprise Threat Shield, On-demand Web

SurfControl Plc., was a British software company based in Cheshire, England. The company provided website filtering, e-mail filtering and desktop security software for both enterprise and home users.

SurfControl was acquired by Websense on 3 October 2007. The purchase price was approximately £204 million ($416 million), including deferred compensation and stock option expense. Websense plans to continue the SurfControl business until at least 2011. On 2 April 2008, Websense sold CyberPatrol, the SurfControl parental control software product, to newly formed Internet safety software company CyberPatrol, LLC. According to Websense's quarterly report, they received $1.4 million in cash from the sale of CyberPatrol assets.

Prior to being acquired by Websense, SurfControl acquired a British cloud computing company called BlackSpider Technologies Limited in July 2006 for £19.5m in cash.

== Product range ==
The current product range is called the Enterprise Protection Suite, and includes products for website and e-mail filtering and user security.

The key feature of the SurfControl filtering software is the ability to categorize websites and then allow or restrict users access by selecting categories.

Examples of the categories are:

- Adult/Sexually Explicit
- Advertisements & Popups
- Personals & Dating
- Proxies & Translators
- Intolerance & Hate

SurfControl also license their URL database and categorization engine to other companies such as Check Point and Novell for use in their products and appliances.
