= Children's Internet Protection Act =

United States federal law

- Acronyms (colloquial): CIPA
- Enacted by: the 106th United States Congress

Citations
- Public law: Pub. L. 106–554 (text) (PDF)
- Statutes at Large: 114 Stat. 2763A-335

Codification
- Titles amended: 20; 47
- U.S.C. sections amended: 20 U.S.C. § 9134; 47 U.S.C. § 254

Legislative history
- Signed into law by President Bill Clinton on December 21, 2000

United States Supreme Court cases
- United States v. American Library Ass'n, 539 U.S. 194 (2003)

The Children's Internet Protection Act (CIPA) is an American statute, passed in 2000, that restricts underage minors from accessing obscene or indecent Internet content via computers in facilities that receive federal funding, such as public schools and libraries. The statute primarily requires those facilities to utilize software filters and similar technology on behalf of underage patrons, but to disable those filters per the request of an adult user.

== Legal history ==
The CIPA was the third attempt by the U.S. Congress to prohibit exposing children to obscenity and indecency on the Internet. The two earlier statutes, the Communications Decency Act (1996) and the Child Online Protection Act (1998), were both struck down by the U.S. Supreme Court as unconstitutional on First Amendment grounds, largely because they were overbroad and not the least restrictive means to achieve the government's goal of shielding children from such material on the Internet.

Learning from those two Supreme Court losses but still hoping to institute some sort of regulation against inappropriate online material that can be accessed by children, Congress tied the suppression of such material to the disbursement of federal funds to facilities that receive that money for computer labs to be used by children. The CIPA requires public schools and libraries to filter such material as a condition for receiving funds. Those schools and libraries typically receive money to build computer labs from the Universal Service Fund, specifically the E-Rate program, which is disbursed by the Federal Communications Commission (FCC).

Those schools and libraries were required to implement "a technology protection measure" on each computer with internet capability, and to use those tools to block sites that display material deemed obscene (and therefore liable to be banned by government) per the Miller Test. However, those filters can be disabled upon request by an adult, particularly at public libraries where children are not the only patrons. For public schools, the CIPA requires monitoring of student Internet use, but this is not the case for public libraries.

The managers of some schools and libraries objected to these requirements, and in the years after the passage of the CIPA about one-third of the public libraries in the United States chose to forfeit their E-Rate funds rather than install the mandated software filters. For any patron requesting access to blocked sites for "bona fide research," the FCC allows libraries to institute their own procedures for determining if the research request is valid, and to disable the filters at their discretion.

Regardless, the American Library Association challenged the constitutionality of the CIPA in court, claiming that the statute required librarians to restrict the First Amendment-protected expression of their patrons. In United States v. American Library Ass'n (2003), the U.S. Supreme Court upheld the CIPA as constitutional because it does not ban material that is appropriate for consenting adults, while the requirement for using software filters in return for federal funding was the least restrictive means of achieving the goal of shielding children from inappropriate content in public environments.

== Legacy ==
The U.S. government's success in passing Supreme Court review for the CIPA, in its third attempt to regulate children's access to inappropriate online content, indicated that future regulations of Internet usage by children could pass constitutional muster if they are narrowly tailored to address a compelling governmental interest. Congress considered expanding the CIPA to include social networking sites in 2006 under the rhetorical of protecting children from predators; the Deleting Online Predators Act was introduced but did not advance to a final vote in the Senate.

Organizations like the International Society for Technology in Education and the Consortium for School Networking regularly petition Congress to update the CIPA to address more recent online technologies and behaviors, without banning Internet usage by children altogether. In the 2020s, a growing number of states have introduced their own statutes to restrict Internet usage by children, particularly in the realms of pornography and cyberbullying, with the narrowly-tailored language of the CIPA and the ruling in United States v. American Library Ass'n typically serving as guidelines.
