= Hugh M. Hefner First Amendment Award =

American award established in 1979

The Hugh M. Hefner First Amendment Award is an award created in honor of Playboy founder Hugh Hefner. The Hugh M. Hefner First Amendment Awards were established by Christie Hefner in 1979 to honor individuals who have made significant contributions in the vital effort to protect and enhance First Amendment rights for Americans. Since the inception of the awards, more than 100 individuals including high school students, lawyers, librarians, journalists and educators have been honored.

Nominees have traditionally come from the areas of journalism, arts and entertainment, education, publishing, law, and government, and winners are selected by a panel of distinguished judges.

== Recipients ==
=== 1980 ===
- Nat Hentoff – Book Publishing
- Erwin Knoll and Howard Morland – Journalism
- Saul Landau and Jack Willis – Journalism
- David Goldberger – Law
- Louis Clark – Government
- Carey McWilliams – Lifetime Achievement

The judges were Tom Bradley, Mayor of Los Angeles; Jules Feiffer, playwright and social cartoonist; Fay Kanin, president, The Academy of Motion Picture Arts and Sciences; Victor Navasky, editor, The Nation; and Tom Wicker, columnist and associate editor, The New York Times.

=== 1981 ===
- Frank Rowe – Book Publishing
- Todd Crowder, Charles Reineke and William Hoffmann Jr. – Journalism
- Edward Asner, Allan Burns, Seth Freeman, and Gene Reynolds – Arts and Entertainment
- William Schannen III – Law
- Morton Halperin – Government
- Kathy Russell – Education
- Stanley Fleishman – Lifetime Achievement

The judges were Edward Brooke, US Senator, Massachusetts; Nat Hentoff, author and columnist, The Village Voice; Fay Kanin, president, The Academy of Motion Picture Arts and Sciences; Judith Krug, director, The American Library Association; and Charles Nesson, Dean, Harvard Law School.

=== 1982 ===
- Franklyn S. Haiman – Book Publishing
- Gene D. Lanier – Education
- Billie Pirner Garde – Government
- Frank Snepp – Individual Conscience
- Steven Pico – Law
- Robert Berger, Herbert Brodkin, Ernest Kinoy and Herbert Wise – Arts and Entertainment
- Melody Sands – Journalism
- Frank J. Donner – Lifetime Achievement

The judges were Yvonne Braithwaite Burke, partner, Kutak, Rode & Huie; Hamilton Fish III, Publisher, The Nation; Florence McMullin, Chair, The Washington Library Association Intellectual Freedom Committee; and Aryeh Neier, Professor of Law, New York University.

=== 1983 ===
- Tom Gish and Pat Gish – Outstanding Community Leadership
- Mark Lynch – Outstanding National Leadership
- Osmond K. Fraenkel – Lifetime Achievement

The judges were Harriet Pilpel, attorney, Weil, Gotshal & Manges; Studs Terkel, author and nationally syndicated radio show host; and William Worthy, international journalist and civil liberties activist.

=== 1984 ===
- Helen Troy and Forest Troy – Outstanding Community Leadership
- Agnus Mackenzie – Outstanding National Leadership
- Frank Wilkinson – Lifetime Achievement

The judges were Martin Agronsky, Agronsky and Company; Alan Dershowitz, professor, Harvard Law School; and Liza Pike, Program Director, Center for Investigative Reporting.

=== 1985 ===
- Clifford McKenzie – Government
- Jack C. Landau – Education
- Ronnie Dugger – Journalism

The judges were Burton Joseph, attorney, Barsy, Joseph & Lichtenstein; Harriet Pilpel, attorney, Weil, Gotshal & Manges; and Melody Sands, former owner of The Athens News.

=== 1986-1987 ===
- Barry Lynn – Government
- Glenna Nowell – Education
- Walter Karp – Book Publishing
- Charles Levendosky – Journalism
- William A. Bradford, Jr., Ricki Seidman, and Mary Weidler – Law

The judges were Julius L. Chambers, president, NAACP Legal Defense and Educational Fund; Maxwell Lillienstein, General Counsel, American Booksellers Association; and Anthony Podesta, founding president, People for the American Way.

=== 1988 ===
- Jamie Kalven – Book Publishing
- Herbert Foerstel – Education
- Rex Armstrong – Law
- Eric Robert Glitzenstein – Government
- David Arnett – Journalism
- Roy Woodruff – Individual Conscience

The judges were Charlayne Hunter-Gault, New York correspondent, The MacNeil / Lehrer NewsHour; Anthony Lewis, syndicated columnist, The New York Times; Steven Pico, First Amendment lecturer and advocate; and Tom Wicker, political columnist, The New York Times.

=== 1989 ===
- Eve Pell – Journalism
- James A. Haught – Journalism
- Thomas Michael Devine – Government
- Joann Bell – Law
- John Henry Faulk – Individual Conscience
- Louis Ingelhart – Education
- Anthony Lewis – Lifetime Achievement

The judges were Judith Krug, director, the American Library Association for Intellectual Freedom; Jack K. Landau, attorney and columnist, Newhouse Newspapers; Clarence Page, Pulitzer Prize-winning columnist, Chicago Tribune; and Harriet Pilpel, attorney, Weil, Gotshal & Manges.

=== 1990 ===
- Paul Conrad – Journalism
- Marilyn Athmann – Education
- Danny Goldberg – Arts and Entertainment
- Hans A. Linde – Law
- Dennis Barrie – Individual Conscience
- Studs Terkel – Lifetime Achievement

The judges were Herbert N. Foerstel, Head of Branch Libraries, University of Maryland; Robert Scheer, national correspondent, Los Angeles Times; and Maxine Waters, US Representative, California.

=== 1991 ===
- Allan Adler – Book Publishing
- Inez Austin – Individual Conscience
- Traci Bauer – Law
- James Dana – Education
- Bella Lewitzky – Arts and Entertainment
- Debbie Nathan – Journalism
- Sydney Schanberg – Government

The judges were Arthur Kropp, president, People for the American Way; Barry Lynn, Co-host, Battleline news radio talk show; Eve Pell, investigative journalist, Freedom of Information Project; and Tom Wicker, political columnist, The New York Times.

=== 1992 ===
- Jules Feiffer – Individual Conscience
- Bruce Rogow – Law
- Natalie Robins – Book Publishing
- Carl Jensen – Education
- Dannie Martin – Journalism
- Peter Sussman – Journalism

The judges were Dennis Barrie, executive director, Contemporary Arts Center of Cincinnati; Norman Dorsen, Stokes Professor of Law, New York University Law School; Mark Goodman, executive director, Student Press Law Center; Barbara Kopple, documentary filmmaker; and Reginald Stuart, Assistant News Editor, Knight-Ridder Newspapers.

=== 1993-1994 ===
- Anthony Griffin – Law
- Robert Landauer – Print Journalism
- Jeff Cohen and Norman Solomon – Book Publishing
- Carole Marlowe – Education
- Jim Warren – Government
- Jean Otto – Lifetime Achievement

The judges were Rex Armstrong, Attorney and Volunteer Counsel, ACLU of Oregon; Jessica Mitford, author and social activist; and Carl Jensen, Founder, Project Censored.

=== 1995-1996 ===
- Jeffrey DeBonis – Government
- Joycelyn Chadwick-Joshua – Education
- Seth Rosenfeld – Print Journalism
- Mary Morello – Arts and Entertainment
- Tom Hull – Law
- Morton Mintz – Lifetime Achievement

The judges were Chris Finan, executive director, The Media Coalition; Marjorie Heins, Director and Staff Counsel, ACLU Arts Censorship Project; and Sydney Schanberg, journalist.

=== 1997 ===
- Dr. Frederic Whitehurst – Government
- Kelli Peterson – Individual Conscience
- Katharine Swan – Journalism
- Cecile Richards – Education
- American Civil Liberties Union – Law
- American Library Association – Law

The judges were Anthony Griffin, attorney; Bobby Handman, president, People for the American Way; and Burton Joseph, attorney, Barsy, Joseph & Lichtenstein.

=== 1998 ===
- Lee Brawner – Education
- Tisha Byars – Individual Conscience
- Goodloe Sutton and Jean Sutton – Journalism

The judges were Nadine Strossen, president, ACLU; Peter S. Prichard, president, Freedom Forum; and Ann K. Symons, president, American Library Association.

=== 1999 ===
- Michael Moore – Arts and Entertainment
- Eugenie C. Scott – Education
- Nicholas Becker – Individual Conscience
- Jeri McGiverin & Elaine Williamson – Law
- Donald Parker – Lifetime Achievement
- Bruce Sanford – Book Publishing

The judges were Mark Goodman, executive director, Student Press Law Center; Molly Ivins, author and columnist, Creators Syndicate; Barbara Kopple, filmmaker; and Clarence Page, columnist, Chicago Tribune.

=== 2000-2001 ===
- Michael Kent Curtis – Book Publishing
- Mary Dana – Education
- Nancy Zennie – Education
- William M. Lawbaugh – Print Journalism
- James Wheaton – Law
- John Seigenthaler - Lifetime Achievement
- Penn & Teller – Arts and Entertainment

The judges were Floyd Abrams, partner, Cahill Gordon & Reindel; Lucy Dalglish; executive director, Reporters Committee for Freedom of the Press; Robert M. O'Neil, director, Thomas Jefferson Center for the Protection of Free Expression; and Nadine Strossen, president, ACLU.

=== 2002-2003 ===
- Trina Magi and Linda Ramsdell – Education
- Ronald K. L. Collins and David Michael Skover – Book Publishing
- David Cole – Book Publishing
- Nate Blakeslee – Law
- Steven Aftergood – Government
- Talia Buford – Print Journalism
- Bill Maher – Arts and Entertainment
- Molly Ivins – Lifetime Achievement

The judges were Margaret Carlson, CNN's The Capital Gang and Time Magazine columnist; Ann Richards, former governor of Texas; and John Seigenthaler, Founder, First Amendment Center.

=== 2006 ===
- Paisley Dodds – Print Journalism
- Patricia Princehouse – Education
- Geoffrey R. Stone – Book Publishing
- Jack Spadaro – Government
- Shelby Knox, Marion Lipschutz, and Rose Rosenblatt – Arts and Entertainment
- Rhett Jackson – Lifetime Achievement

The judges were Katrina vanden Heuvel, editor and publisher, The Nation; Anthony D. Romero, executive director, American Civil Liberties Union; and Eugenie Scott, executive director, National Center for Science Education.

=== 2008 ===
- Greg Lukianoff – Freedom of Expression
- Heather Gillman – Law
- Mark Klein – Government

The judges were Nadine Strossen, president, American Civil Liberties Union and professor of law, New York Law School; Geoffrey Stone, Edward H. Levi Distinguished Service Professor at University of Chicago Law School; and David Rubin, professor and former dean, S.I. Newhouse School of Public Communications, Syracuse University.

=== 2012 ===
- Rebecca MacKinnon – Book Publishing
- Pablo Alvarado – Law
- Thomas Drake – Government
- Jesselyn Radack – Government
- Zack Kopplin – Education
- Stanley K. Sheinbaum – Lifetime Achievement

The judges were Hector Villagra; Patricia Schroeder; Robert Scheer; and Norman Lear.

=== 2013 ===
- Morris Davis – Government
- Jessica Ahlquist – Education
- Norman Lear – Lifetime Achievement
- Marjorie Heins for her book Priests of Our Democracy: The Supreme Court, Academic Freedom, and the Anti-Communist Purge.

The judges were Henry Weinstein from the University of California, Ramona Ripston and Dr. Charles C. Haynes, Director of the Religious Freedom Education Project.

=== 2014 ===
- Muneer Awad – Government
- Glenn Greenwald – Journalism
- Norman Dorsen – Lifetime Achievement
- Thomas Healy – Book Publishing
- Michael Hiestand and Mary Beth Tinker – For organizing the Tinker Tour
- Chris Finan – Law

The judges were Margaret Carlson, Laura W. Murphy Director if the ACLU's Washington Legislative Office, and Joan E. Bertin Executive Director of National Coalition Against Censorship.

=== 2015 ===
- Steve Listopad – Education
- Malkia Cyril – Government
- Zephyr Teachout – Book Publishing
- James Risen – Print Journalism
- Victor Navasky – Lifetime Achievement

=== 2017 ===
- Burt Neuborne – Lifetime Achievement
- Hasan Elahi – Arts & Entertainment
- Timothy Garton Ash – Book Publishing
- Jenni Monet – Print Journalism

The judges were Erwin Chemerinsky, Dean and Professor of Law, University of California Berkeley School of Law; Lara Bergthold, Principal Partner at RALLY; and Davan Maharaj, editor-in-chief and Publisher of the Los Angeles Times Media Group.

=== 2018 ===
- Joan E. Bertin – Lifetime Achievement
- Simon Tam – Arts & Entertainment
- Laura Kipnis – Book Publishing
- Allison Stanger – Education
- Jamie Kalevn – Journalism

The judges were Michael A. Bamberger, Author and Senior Counsel at Dentons; Shelby Coffey III, Journalist; and Zephyr Teachout, Political Activist and Professor at Fordham University School of Law.

=== 2019 ===
- Floyd Abrams – Lifetime Achievement
- Christian Bales – Education
- Theodore J. Boutrous – Law
- Grace Marion – Journalism
- George Luber – Government
- Greg Lukianoff, Jonathan Haidt – Book Publishing

The judges were Karen Tumulty, Columnist and Correspondent; Neal Katyal Professor of Law and former Acting Solicitor General of the United States; and Michael B. Keegan, president of People for the American Way and People for the American Way Foundation.

=== 2020 ===
- Ira Glasser – Lifetime Achievement
- Michael Frazier – Education
- David E. McCraw – Law
- Omar Jimenez – Journalism
- Andrea L. Dennis and Erik Nielson – Book Publishing
- Christina Clusiau and Shaul Schwarz – Arts & Entertainment

The judges were Ted Boutros, partner at Gibson, Dunn & Crutcher LLP, and global co-chair of the firm's Litigation Group; and Kyle Pope, editor-in-chief and publisher of the Columbia Journalism Review.

=== 2022 ===
- Michael Bamberger – Lifetime Achievement
- Dawn Wooten – Government
- Joslyn Diffenbaugh – Education
- Amy Sohn – Book Publishing
- Manuel Duran – Journalism

The judges were Allison Stanger, Russell Leng ’60 Professor of International Politics and Economics at Middlebury College; Julia B. Chan, editor-in-chief of The 19th, an independent, nonprofit newsroom; and Will Creeley, Legal Director of the Foundation for Individual Rights in Education (FIRE).

== See also ==
- Free Speech, "The People's Darling Privilege" book published in 2000, recognized with the award
- William O. Douglas Prize
