= The Abortion Pill =

1997 documentary film

The Abortion Pill is a 1997 documentary that examines the pros and cons of a Mifepristone (RU486), a drug that can end pregnancy without surgery. The film was produced and directed by Marion Lipschutz and Rose Rosenblatt of Incite Pictures.

== Awards ==
- Chicago International Film Festival's annual award for a social/political documentary
