= Rick Baitz =

American composer

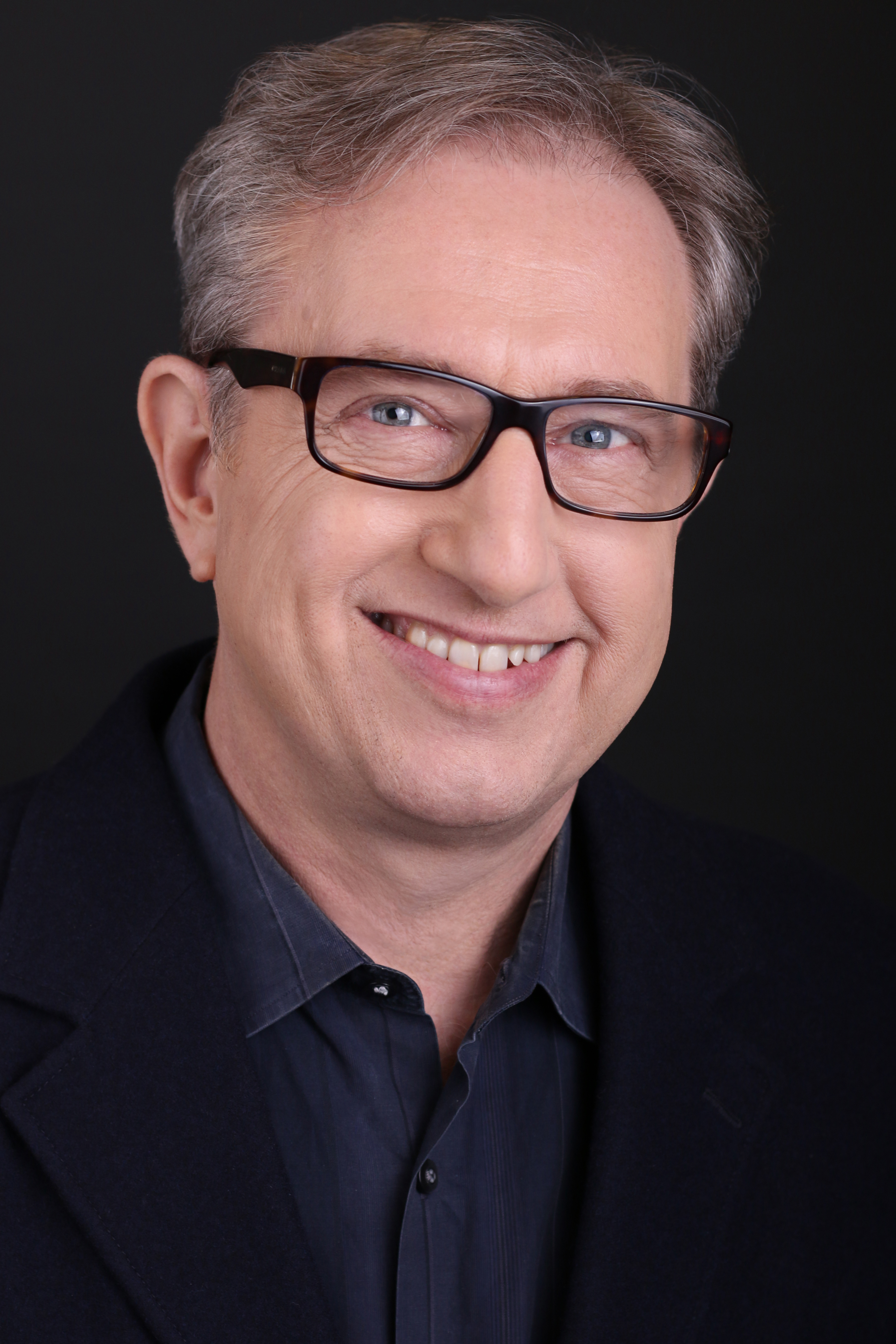

Background information
- Origin: Los Angeles, California
- Genres: Classical, Film, Theater
- Occupations: Composer, educator
- Instrument: Pianist
- Years active: 1980s–present
- Labels: Innova Recordings, Neuma Records
- Website: http://www.rickbaitz.com

Richard Keith Baitz is an American composer, born in 1954. His work incorporates elements of classical, jazz, electronic and world music, and has been extensively utilized for the concert stage, film, television, theatre, and dance. He has also served on the faculties of The Juilliard School, Vermont College of Fine Arts, and Columbia College Chicago, and was founding director of BMI’s "Composing for the Screen" workshop in New York City.

== Biography ==
=== Early life and education ===
Born in Los Angeles, Baitz spent his childhood in California, Rio de Janeiro, Brazil, and Durban, South Africa. He graduated from Fairfax High School in Los Angeles, and briefly attended the University of Natal in Durban, later returning to the United States to study at Georgetown University.

Baitz eventually transferred to Manhattan School of Music, receiving a Bachelors and Masters of Music, studying composition with Elias Tanenbaum, Charles Wuorinen and Ursula Mamlok. As a Composition Fellow at the Tanglewood Music Center in 1980, he studied with George Perle, and attended his first film scoring seminar, led by John Williams. He completed a Doctor of Musical Arts at Columbia University in 1991, studying with Mario Davidovsky and Jack Beeson. The same year, he also attended the BMI Film Scoring Workshop in Los Angeles, led by Earle Hagan.

=== Musical career ===
Baitz's early work as a composer focused on electro-acoustic pieces for varied instrumentations, including African Dreams (1977) for electronic tape, Triophany (1977) for alto saxophone, piano and double bass, and Seven Haiku by Basho (1978) for soprano and mixed ensemble.

In 1987, Baitz's composition Kaleidocycles, commissioned by iEAR Studios at Rensselaer Polytechnic Institute, was featured at the Tanglewood Contemporary Music Festival. 1988 marked the first of several theatrical collaborations with his brother, playwright Jon Robin Baitz, including incidental music to The Film Society at New York's Second Stage Theater, Three Hotels for PBS’ American Playhouse, and Ten Unknowns at Boston's Huntington Theater.

Baitz's concert work in the 1980s and ‘90s included Into Light for clarinet, viola and piano; The Riverfisher for chamber orchestra, voices and electronics, with text by poet Tory Dent; and his Juilliard-commissioned electro-acoustic quintet River of January, which won first prize in the Delius Composition Contest. River of January was selected by The International Society of Contemporary Music to represent the US in the 1993 World New Music Days, held in Mexico City. In 2023, River of January was chosen to return to the World New Music Days for its Centennial Festival, held in South Africa; in December, Rick played the piece in Cape Town (on keyboard) with an ensemble of stellar South African musicians. River of January was recorded in New York in 2023, and is the title piece of Rick's most recent album, released in May 2024 on Neuma Records.

From 1992 through 1998, he shared a music production studio in midtown Manhattan with mentor Buryl Red, where he scored multiple National Geographic documentaries, including The New Chimpanzees, Stolen Treasures, and the mini-series Heart of Africa. In 1998, he built his own studio, Rick Baitz Music, where he composed many soundtracks for PBS and HBO, including Life Afterlife, Body & Soul: Diana & Kathy, The Education of Shelby Knox, and The Vagina Monologues.

In 2018, Baitz released an album of his concert music, Into Light, on Innova Recordings. The CD features three pieces for acoustic and electro-acoustic ensembles. Chthonic Dances, written for the ETHEL string quartet, drew inspiration from Baitz's early experiences of the musical and dance cultures of Brazil and South Africa. The piece premiered at the Tribeca New Music Festival in May 2011. Hall of Mirrors, commissioned by The Juilliard School, integrates varied ancient and modern percussion instruments with electronic effects. Into Light, composed in 1984, features clarinet, viola and piano. Rick's subsequent album, River of January, released on Neuma Records in May 2024, features four pieces: the title composition, River of January (1991); the electro-acoustic quintet Music For A Sacred Space (2021); Dark Fire, for violin and cello (1992); and Two Poems for Flute & Alto Flute Solo (1980, rev. 1984), played by Erin Lesser.

In 2016, Baitz scored the short film Remembering Pearl Harbor for an installation at the Franklin D. Roosevelt Presidential Library and Museum in Hyde Park, NY. This was followed by several scores for the Mississippi Civil Rights Museum, integrating elements of Mississippi Delta blues, electronics and spirituals, with voice-overs by Oprah Winfrey.

Baitz's recent work includes the soundtrack to Rob Garver’s acclaimed 2018 feature documentary What She Said: The Art of Pauline Kael; incidental music to the Jon Robin Baitz play I'll Be Seein' Ya for The Center Theatre Group's Digital Stage in 2022; incidental music to the 2025 off-Broadway play Zagłada, written by Richard Vetere; and a duo for piano and percussion, New York City, 4AM, premiered by Composers Concordance in 2025.

=== As an educator ===
Since 2018, Baitz has served on the faculty of The Juilliard School, where he currently teaches Scoring to Picture in the Composition Program of the Extension Division.

He is a core faculty member of the low-residency MFA in Composition program at Vermont College of Fine Arts (an affiliate of CalArts), where he served as Chair from 2012 until 2016. The program integrates contemporary concert music, music for media, electronic music, songwriting and jazz.

In 2008, Baitz founded BMI's New York city-based film scoring mentorship program "Composing for the Screen", which he ran for 13 years. He also served as Director of Composition Studies at Columbia College Chicago for the 2007–08 academic year, doubling as lead composition instructor in their Master of Fine Arts (MFA) program in film scoring.

=== Awards ===
Baitz was awarded one of BMI's highest honors, the Classic Contribution Award, at the 2018 BMI Film, TV & Visual Media awards in Los Angeles. The award honored and acknowledged his role as Founding Director of BMI's "Composing for the Screen" workshop.

Other honors include: Grammy Nomination as an arranger for Wondrous Love – Feel The Spirit (Resimiranda Records, 2000); Grand Prize and Chamber Music Award, 1993 Delius Composition Contest (for River of January); multiple awards from Meet the Composer and the American Music Center; and fellowships to The MacDowell Colony, Yaddo, The Edward Albee Foundation, The Millay Colony, and The Virginia Center for the Creative Arts.

=== Personal life ===
In addition to his work in music, in his earlier life he worked as a deckhand on a dredger in Durban, South Africa and as a cab driver in New York City. More recently, he has served as an expert witness in legal cases involving music. He lives in New York City.

== Discography ==
	Title	Award	Year	Label
1	River of January		2024	Neuma Records
2	What She Said: The Art of Pauline Kael (Soundtrack)		2020	Rick Baitz Music
3	Into Light		2018	Innova
4	Songs for a Healthier America		2013	Hip Hop Public Health
5	Who Cares About Kelsey (Soundtrack)		2013	CD Baby
6	Meditations for Sound Healing		2006	The Relaxation Company
7	The Better and Better Series		2006	Elizabeth Hepburn
8	Beautiful Star – A Celebration of Christmas		2006	Resimiranda
9	Wondrous Love – Feel The Spirit	Grammy Nomination	2000	Resimiranda
10	Making Music		1995–2005	Silver-Burdette
11	Ana Caram: Amazonia (as keyboard player and vocalist)		1990	Chesky Records
12	CDCM Vol II: Kaleidocycles		1987	Centaur

== Works ==
=== Film and television scores ===
- The Goldfish (1978)
- Le Plan Americaine (Stephen Wasserstein, 1980)
- Double Dealing (Stephen Wasserstein, 1982)
- Three Hotels (Jon Robin Baitz, 1991)
- Still Life (Anne Debroah Levy, 1994)
- Polio Water (Caroline Kava, 1995)
- The New Chimpanzees (1995)(for National Geographic)
- Last Summer in the Hamptons (Henry Jaglom, 1995)
- Heart of Africa: Fire and Ice (1996)(for National Geographic)
- Heart of Africa: Jewel of the Rift (1996)(for National Geographic)
- Heart of Africa: Forest Primeval (1996)(for National Geographic)
- The Irreversible Year (Stephen Olivieri, 1996)
- The Substance of Fire (Dan Sullivan, 1996)(based on play by Jon Robin Baitz)
- Looters (1997)(for National Geographic)
- Number One (Caroline Kava, 1998)
- The Family Life of Animals: Adventures in Childrearing (1998)
- The Family Life of Animals: The Road to Independence (1998)
- The Lost American (Sherry Jones, 1998)(documentary feature for Frontline
- Fresco (1999)(documentary feature for PBS)
- The Geography of Nowhere (2000)
- Uncommon Grounds (2000)
- Baby Steps (Geoffrey Nauffts, 2000)
- Life Afterlife (Lisa F. Jackson, 2000)(documentary for HBO)
- King of the Jungle (2001)
- Live Free or Die (Rose Rosenblatt, 2001)
- Bringing Durban Home (2002)
- The Vagina Monologues (2002)
- Project ALS (2003)
- Guns & Mothers (Thom Powers, 2003) (documentary for PBS)
- A Family Undertaking (Beth Westrate, 2004)(documentary for PBS)
- Until the Violence Stops aka World VDay (Eve Ensler, 2004)
- Fitness Fighters (2005)
- The Education of Shelby Knox (2005)(documentary for PBS; winner of Sundance and South By Southwest film festivals)
- The Better and Better Series (2006)
- Amexicano (2007)
- Body & Soul: Diane & Kathy (2008)(documentary for PBS; short list for Academy Award nomination)
- Jesus, Maria (Caroline Kava, 2009)
- Power & Control: Domestic Violence in America (Peter Cohn, 2010)
- Who Cares About Kelsey? (Dan Habib, 2012)
- Restraint & Seclusion: Hear Our Stories (Dan Habib, 2013)
- Your Stroke Is My Stroke (2013)
- Remembering Pearl Harbor (Monadnock Media, 2016)
- Why We March (Monadnock Media, 2017)
- Emmett Till (Monadnock Media, 2017)
- Freedom Summer (Monadnock Media, 2017)
- We Speak NYC: Crossing the Street (2018)
- What She Said: The Art of Pauline Kael (Rob Garver, 2018)

=== Concert music ===
- Untitled Piano Piece (1975)
- African Dreams (1977)
- Triophany (1977)
- Silky (1978)
- Seven Haiku by Basho (1978)
- Music for Orchestra (1979)
- Septuor Cinematique (1980)
- Music for Horn and Orchestra (1980)
- Diapason (1983)
- Two Poems for Flute and Alto Flute Solo (1980, rev. 1984)
- Into Light (1984)
- Shaking the Air (1985)
- Kaleidocycles (1985)
- Ojala (1987)
- The Riverfisher (1989)
- Three Murders (1991)
- River of January (1991)
- Dark Fire (1992)
- Who’ll Be A Witness (1999)
- Glory, Glory (2002)
- Chthonic Dances (2010, rev. 2016)
- Hall of Mirrors (2015)
- Music for a Sacred Space (2021)
- New York City, 4AM (2024)

=== Music for the Theater ===
- The Film Society (1988; Second Stage Theater, NYC. Jon Robin Baitz, playwright.)
- Dutch Landscape (1989; Mark Taper Forum, Los Angeles Music Center. Jon Robin Baitz, playwright.)
- Three Hotels (1992; Circle Repertory Theatre, NYC. Jon Robin Baitz, playwright.)
- A Fair Country (1994; Naked Angels, NYC. Jon Robin Baitz, playwright.)
- The Road To Mecca (1997; Long Wharf Theatre, New Haven. Athol Fugard, playwright.)
- Ten Unknowns (2003; Huntington Theatre, Boston. Jon Robin Baitz, playwright.)
- Fear: The Issues Project (2004; Naked Angels, NYC. Various playwrights.)
- The Insolvencies (2021; Ojai Playwrights Festival Digital Stage. Jon Robin Baitz, playwright.)
- I'll Be Seein' Ya (2022; Mark Taper Forum, Los Angeles Music Center Digital Stage. Jon Robin Baitz, playwright.)
- Zagłada (2025; American Theatre of Actors. Starring Len Cariou; Richard Vetere, playwright.)
- The Painter (2026; American Theatre of Actors; Richard Vetere, playwright.)
