= Deutscher Journalisten-Verband =

Trade union and professional association of German journalists

DJV
- (in English) German Federation of Journalists (in French) Association des journalistes allemands
- Deutscher Journalisten-Verband
- Founded: 1949
- Headquarters: Berlin, Germany
- Location: Germany
- Members: 38,000
- Key people: Beth Costa, general secretary Michael Konken, president
- Affiliations: Professional federation
- Website: www.djv.de

The Deutscher Journalisten-Verband (DJV) or German Journalists Association is among the largest journalists' organizations in Europe. The DJV has its headquarters in Berlin and has about 38,000 members. The chairman since 2003 has been the journalist Michael Konken, while the deputy national chairman since 2007 is Ulrike Kaiser. The federal executive of the organization is Kajo Dohring, while from 1989 to 1998 Hermann Meyn was chairman of the association.

== History ==
The DJV was founded in Berlin in 1949. On 24 November 1971, it officially adopted the Munich Charter that lists the main journalistic duties and rights to which all its members pledge to abide. The DJV has had its headquarters in Berlin since 2005, and has more than doubled the number of its members since 1988. The DJV throughout its history has constantly strived to create opportunities for exchange among journalists from different countries as well as to meet colleagues from other fields in order to create and encourage an open discussion about new developments in the media sector within expert circles. To that end the association periodically brings journalists together at national and global meetings, congresses, or in regional and local forums and conferences.

The DJV is a member of the International Federation of Journalists (IFJ).

== International Press Freedom Award ==
The Deutsche Journalisten Verband grants annually the "International Press Freedom" award (Pressefreiheit Preis) to journalists who have distinguished themselves worldwide in the cause of freedom of information, freedom of speech and freedom of press.

== See also ==
- Editorial independence
- Free Speech, "The People's Darling Privilege"
- Freedom of speech
- Journalism
- Journalism ethics and standards
- IFEX (organization)
- Journaliste en danger
- List of freedom indices
- Hermann Kesten Prize
- Media blackout
- Media transparency
