= Jennifer Pozner =

American writer

- Born: August 30, 1974 (age 52); New York, NY
- Occupations: Author, anti-racist feminist, media critic, public speaker
- Notable credit(s): Founder and executive director of Women in Media & News (2001–present) Author of Reality TV Bites Back: The Troubling Truth About Guilty Pleasure TV (2010); Journalist/board of editors of In These Times magazine Media commentator on NBC News, CNN, Fox News, MSNBC, ABC News Now, GRITtv, Democracy Now!, National Public Radio, The Daily Show with Jon Stewart

Jennifer Pozner is an American author, intersectional feminist, media critic, and public speaker. In 1996, Pozner graduated with a bachelor's degree in journalism, media criticism and women's studies from Hampshire College.

== Career ==
Pozner is the founder and executive director of Women in Media and News (WIMN), a media analysis, education and advocacy groups, editor of WIMN's Voices, a blog on women and media, and author of Reality TV Bites Back: The Troubling Truth About Guilty Pleasure TV. Pozner serves on the board of editors of In These Times magazine. Her work has appeared in corporate news outlets such as, Newsday, Chicago Tribune and the Boston Phoenix; independent magazines such as, Ms. Magazine, The American Prospect and Bitch: Feminist Response to Pop Culture; and online media such as, Women's Enews, AlterNet, and Salon as a professional media critique.

=== Early career ===
Before founding WIMN, Pozner was director of the Women's Desk for the journalism watchdog group Fairness & Accuracy in Reporting (FAIR) (1999–2001), wrote for Extra!magazine and was a columnist for the feminist newspaper Soujourner: The Women's Form (1997–2000). She founded WIMN in 2001.

Pozner advocates against sexist and misogynistic representations of women in popular culture working as a media commentator for: NBC News, CNN, Fox News, MSNBC, ABC News Now, GRITtv, Democracy Now!, National Public Radio and The Daily Show with Jon Stewart. Additionally, she has served as an adviser for and has been featured in several documentaries films, including I Was A Teenage Feminist and Miss Representation.

Pozner produced and co-wrote "Reality Rehab with Dr. Jenn," a satirical web series which promotes media literacy and has been used in countries worldwide. She also won the "Voice of Women" award at the 2017 Women's Choice Awards which honored her work promoting positive portrayals of women and girls in the media.
