= What She Said: The Art of Pauline Kael =

2018 biographical documentary film by Rob Garver

- Film poster
- Directed by: Rob Garver
- Written by: Rob Garver
- Produced by: Rob Garver; Glen Zipper
- Starring: Pauline Kael; Sarah Jessica Parker (voice of Pauline); Camille Paglia; Paul Schrader; Quentin Tarantino; David O. Russell; Francis Ford Coppola; Molly Haskell; Greil Marcus; John Boorman; Stephanie Zacharek; John Guare; Christopher Durang; David V. Picker; Tom Pollock; Brian Kellow; Carol Baum
- Cinematography: Vincent C. Ellis
- Edited by: Rob Garver
- Music by: Rick Baitz
- Distributed by: Juno Films
- Release dates: August 31, 2018 (Telluride); December 13, 2019
- Running time: 98 minutes
- Country: United States
- Language: English

What She Said: The Art of Pauline Kael is a 2018 American biographical documentary film about the life and work of the controversial New Yorker film critic Pauline Kael. The film was directed, produced and edited by Rob Garver, and features Sarah Jessica Parker as the voice of Pauline, and over 30 participants, including Quentin Tarantino, David O. Russell, Paul Schrader, and Kael's only child, Gina James. Oscar-winning producer Glen Zipper (Undefeated) also served as a producer for the film.

What She Said premiered at the 2018 Telluride Film Festival, and also had its international premiere at the 2019 Berlinale Film Festival. The film was released by Juno Films in the United States on December 13, 2019, where it received positive reviews from critics.

== Background and production ==
Director Garver said he had read Pauline Kael's work as a young person in the 1980s, and was inspired by her spirit, humor and insight. In 2014, he began to research her life and writing. Garver said his conception of the film was to try to tell the story of her life and work through her own words. The narrative uses excerpts from her published writing, pieces from her letters and interviews to tell Pauline's story alongside clips from numerous films she reviewed.

Interviews were shot in New York, Philadelphia, Massachusetts, and California. Audience recreations used in the film were shot in two historic cinemas—the Loew's Jersey Theater in Jersey City and the Lansdowne Theatre in suburban Philadelphia. Research was conducted at the Lilly Library at Indiana University in Bloomington, which houses the Kael archives. Archival Producer Rich Remsberg worked with the director to uncover new material on Kael and archival interviews with Pauline and others are seen or heard in the film, including those with Woody Allen, Jerry Lewis, Norman Mailer, Peter Bogdanovich, Robert Evans, Ridley Scott and William Peter Blatty.

== Release ==
What She Said premiered at the 2018 Telluride Film Festival, and also had its international premiere at the 2019 Berlinale Film Festival. In December 2019, the film opened in New York at the Film Forum and in Los Angeles, and went on to play in approximately 50 theaters in North America. After the onset of the COVID-19 pandemic, the movie continued to play virtually through July, 2020. What She Said also aired on the Sky Arts network in the United Kingdom in July, as well as airing in Denmark, Spain, Poland, New Zealand and Israel in 2020.

=== Home media ===
The film was released on DVD on June 16, 2020, with extra material, including two deleted scenes and an audio interview Kael conducted with Alfred Hitchcock in 1974.

== Reception ==
On the website Rotten Tomatoes, the film has an approval rating of 88%, based on 68 reviews, with an average rating of 7/10. The website's consensus reads, "What She Said: The Art of Pauline Kael clearly outlines the gifts that made its subject special while offering an engaging overview of her remarkable life and career." On the website Metacritic, the film has a score of 68 out of 100, based on 16 critics.

Owen Gleiberman in Variety wrote, "Rob Garver's beautifully crafted documentary channels the timeless headiness of Pauline Kael, arguably the greatest film critic who ever lived ... With Sarah Jessica Parker reading Pauline’s words on the soundtrack, What She Said plays like a twirling kaleidoscope of Kael's criticism and film history that's fully in touch with the devil-may-care imperiousness of her personality."
