= Dossier: The Secret Files They Keep on You =

- Author: Aryeh Neier
- Subject: Record-keeping
- Genre: Non-fiction
- Published: 1974
- Publisher: Stein and Day
- Publication place: United States
- Pages: 216
- ISBN: 9780812817201
- OCLC: 869351133

Dossier: The Secret Files They Keep on You is a 1974 book about record-keeping by Aryeh Neier when he was the executive director of the ACLU. Neier writes that many institutions, from schools to credit and law enforcement agencies, keep secret files on American citizens and share them widely with future employers without their consent.

== Summary ==
Neier writes that negative musings from school teachers can have a negative effect on the rest of someone's life and significantly diminish their career prospects. He adds that records kept by credit agencies, the FBI or mental health institutions can have a similarly negative impact on someone's future. Neier takes the "radical" position that all records should be expunged.

== Criticism ==
Writing for the Austin American-Statesman, Marsha Walker explains, "every American (without exception) is stamped, categorized, and recorded in ostensibly confidential files--files which are private to no one except to the person about whom they are kept," and she concludes that it may be "the most horrific indictment of our justice system today."

Reviewing the book for the American Bar Association Journal, Paul D. Pearlstein opines, "As unfortunate as it is to realize that hundreds of existing files may contain distorted, untruthful, or negative statements about individuals, it is more horrendous to recognize the ease with which these written records are transmitted and communicated without the subject's knowledge or permission." Writing for the San Francisco Examiner, William Flynn writes that the book suggests American society has failed to delineate where privacy ends and secrecy begins.

The San Mateo Times called it "an extremely important book affecting everyone."
