= These Times =

These Times may refer to:

- These Times (Mike Stern album), 2004
- These Times (SafetySuit album), 2012
- These Times (The Dream Syndicate album), 2019

== See also ==
- In These Times (disambiguation)
- The Times (disambiguation)
