= Harriet Pilpel =

American attorney and women's rights activist

- Born: Harriet Fleischl; December 2, 1911; The Bronx, New York
- Died: April 23, 1991 (aged 79); Manhattan, New York
- Education: Vassar College; Columbia University; Columbia Law School
- Occupation: Attorney
- Spouse(s): Robert C. Pilpel (1933–1987); Irvin B. Schwartz (1989–1991)
- Children: Judith Ethel, Robert Harry

Harriet Fleischl Pilpel (December 2, 1911 – April 23, 1991) was an American attorney and women's rights activist. She wrote and lectured extensively regarding the freedom of speech, freedom of the press, and reproductive freedom. Pilpel served as general counsel for both the American Civil Liberties Union and Planned Parenthood. During her career, she participated in 27 cases that came before the United States Supreme Court. Pilpel was involved in the birth control movement and the pro-choice movement. She helped to establish the legal rights of minors to abortion and contraception.

== Biography ==
=== Early life and education ===
Harriet Fleischl was born on December 2, 1911, to Julius and Ethel (née Loewy) Fleischl in the Bronx. She had two younger sisters, Juliette and Ruth.

She graduated from Vassar College in 1932. In 1933 she received her master's degree in public law and international law from the Columbia University. She received her J.D. in 1936 from Columbia Law School, where she graduated second in her class. She was hired by law firm Greenbaum, Wolf & Ernst following her graduation.

=== Legal career ===
During her career, Pilpel played a role in 27 cases that were heard by the Supreme Court of the United States. Her scholarly work was often cited by the Court and in legislative debate. Law professor Sylvia A. Law writes that Pilpel "was a brilliant legal tactician with a deep knowledge of the nuance of doctrine, but she was also acutely attuned to political opinion, organizational politics, the press, religious feeling, and the broad cultural forces that shape constitutional principles."

Pilpel was a protégé of Morris Ernst, who co-founded the ACLU. Through her work with Greenbaum, Wolf & Ernst, Pilpel was involved with the birth control movement, taking cases such as State v. Nelson (1940) and Tileston v. Ullman (1943). She supported the struggles to overturn birth control laws at the state level, working alongside movement activist Margaret Sanger.

The early reproductive rights movement challenged anti-obscenity Comstock laws. Pilpel was one of three attorneys who represented the Kinsey Institute in a lawsuit against the United States Customs Service, after an Indianapolis customs collector deemed sex-related literature "grossly obscene" and began impounding the materials in 1950. Seven years later, in 1957, she won the case before the Federal District Court. Pilpel was also versed in matrimonial law and co-authored the 1952 book entitled Your Marriage and the Law with Theodora Zavin. She also represented publishers and writers in cases involving copyright law. Her clients included Betty Friedan, Mel Brooks, Billy Graham, Edna Ferber, Svetlana Alliluyeva, Jerome Kern, and Erich Maria Remarque. In 1965 she represented pediatrician Benjamin Spock in a case determining whether advertisements placed in The Common Sense Book of Baby and Child Care violated Dr. Spock's free speech rights.

"Nowhere is the lag between the law on the books and the mores of the American people more obvious than in the field of the legal restrictions touching on birth control." — Harriet F. Pilpel, 1943

Pilpel was involved with the pro-choice movement. In 1961, she argued on behalf of Planned Parenthood in Poe v. Ullman, asking the Supreme Court to reverse a Connecticut law criminalizing birth control. She wrote Planned Parenthood's amicus curiae brief for that case as well as that for 1965's Griswold v. Connecticut. Pilpel was influenced by ideas that the right to privacy upheld in Griswold could be extended to a woman's right to abortion. She put abortion on the agenda of the ACLU Biennial Conference in 1964, though the board did not take up the issue until 1967. Alongside Aryeh Neier, Pilpel helped organize the campaign against New York's anti-abortion law. She authored Planned Parenthood's amicus brief for Roe v. Wade and strategized with attorneys Sarah Weddington and Linda Coffee, organizing moot court practices prior to arguments in the case. Following the passage of Roe in 1973, she mentored lawyers who tried to prevent the exclusion of abortions from Medicaid.

Pilpel helped to establish minors' rights to abortion and contraception. She presented a paper on the legal rights of minors to the International Council of Women in 1973. She argued in 1977's Carey v. Population Services International on behalf of a minor's right to acquire contraceptives without parental consent.

During the 1960s, Pilpel served on the Presidential Commission on the Status of Women under the Kennedy and Johnson administrations. Beginning in 1965, Pilpel was an advisor to the United States Women's Bureau of the United States Department of Labor. She was chair of the Law Panel International of Planned Parenthood Federation from 1970 to 1978. From 1979 to 1986, she served as general counsel for the American Civil Liberties Union (ACLU). She served on the boards of the Guttmacher Institute, the ACLU, and NARAL. She was also co-chair of the National Coalition Against Censorship. In the 1950s and 1960s Pilpel also wrote a monthly column for Publishers Weekly entitled "But Can You Do That?" She appeared frequently on William F. Buckley Jr.'s television show Firing Line.

In 1982, she joined the law firm Weil, Gotshal & Manges. That year, she donated her research files to Smith College's Sophia Smith Collection.

== Selected bibliography ==
- Pilpel, Harriet; Zavin, Theodora (1952). Your Marriage and the Law. Toronto: Rinehart. OCLC 5773584.
- ——; Zavin, Theodora (1960). Rights and Writers: A Handbook of Literary and Entertainment Law. New York: Dutton. OCLC 1457829.
- ——; Goldberg, Morton David (1960). A copyright guide. New York: R. R. Bowker Co. OCLC 964807.
- ——; Peyser, Minna Post (1965). Know Your Rights: What a working wife should know about her legal rights.
- —— (June 1969). "The Right of Abortion". The Atlantic Monthly.

== Personal life ==
On June 15, 1933, she married social service executive Robert C. Pilpel. In 1987, Pilpel was widowed. She remarried, to New York Medical College administrator Irvin B. Schwartz on March 13, 1989. She died of a heart attack on April 23, 1991, in Manhattan. She was 79.

Her son, Robert Harry Pilpel, is an author.

== Honors ==
Pilpel was honored with a fellowship in NYU Law's Hays Program, the Harriet Pilpel-Planned Parenthood Fellowship.
