= How to Lose Your Virginity =

2013 American documentary film by Therese Shechter

- Directed by: Therese Shechter
- Written by: Therese Shechter
- Produced by: Therese Shechter and Lisa Esselstein
- Edited by: Dina Guttman, Marin Sander-Holzman
- Music by: Stephen Thomas Cavit
- Distributed by: Women Make Movies
- Release date: November 17, 2013 (DOC NYC)
- Running time: 67 minutes
- Country: United States
- Language: English

How to Lose Your Virginity is an American documentary film directed by Therese Shechter and distributed by Women Make Movies. The film examines how the concept of virginity shapes the sexual lives of young women and men through the intersecting forces of history, politics, religion and popular culture. It premiered at DOC NYC, a New York City documentary festival, on November 17, 2013.

== Synopsis ==
How to Lose Your Virginity explores the concept of virginity from historical origins of the word, virgin, to the modern day definitions perpetuated in popular culture. The film takes a critical look at how virginity is ‘restored’ through hymenoplasty, fetishized by pornography, and celebrated at purity balls. Linking virginity culture to commerce, the film follows Natalie Dylan's virginity auction and the sales of artificial hymen on the internet. Shechter also visits the set of Barely Legal and discusses the success of the "virginity porn" genre. How to Lose Your Virginity questions the effectiveness of the abstinence-only sex education movement and observes how sexuality continues to define a young woman's morality and self-worth. The meaning and necessity of virginity as a social construct is also examined through narration and interviews with notable sexuality experts, such as: former Surgeon General Dr. Joycelyn Elders, "Scarleteen" creator and editor Heather Corinna, historian Hanne Blank, author Jessica Valenti, and comprehensive sex education advocate Shelby Knox.

== Production ==
The film was directed by Therese Shechter, whose production company Trixie Films is based in Brooklyn. Working with Producer Lisa Esselstein, How to Lose Your Virginity was shot over several years in the U.S. and Canada. Other films produced by Trixie Films include the documentary feature I Was A Teenage Feminist and the documentary shorts "How I Learned to Speak Turkish" and "#slutwalknyc".

Shechter was inspired to make the film because of the growing abstinence until marriage movement and her own experiences as an older virgin. While making the film, Shechter became engaged and incorporated trying on white wedding dresses into the film as a way of looking at how the wedding industry sells virginity.

Over the course of the film's production, its transmedia companion, The V-Card Diaries has crowd-sourced over 200 stories about what the site calls "sexual debuts and deferrals." It was exhibited at The Kinsey Institute's 8th Annual Juried Art Show, the exhibit's first interactive piece.

== Critical reception ==
Soraya Chemaly wrote in the Huffington Post, "Virginity is a powerful and malleable concept, as evidenced by the teenagers in Therese Shechter's smart, funny and provoking documentary." Leigh Kolb of Bitch Flicks said that "There's no anger, there's no judgment…Shechter’s ability to teach, dismantle, expose and explore is remarkable. The audience is left with newfound knowledge with which they can criticize myths of virginity in our culture. However, the audience is also left with respect for everyone’s stories. When a documentary can do that, it succeeds in a big way."

In the Jakarta Globe, Paul Freelend wrote that "her work to highlight what she calls the 'virginity culture' and the misconceptions surrounding it may resonate as loudly in Indonesia and other developing countries as in the United States." Basil Tsoikos, programmer for the Sundance Film Festival and DOC NYC, in What (not) to doc remarked that "Shechter seems like the perfect filmmaker to tackle the complexities around virginity. It’s a topic that far too many people are obsessed about – probably for all the wrong reasons – so the film is sure to stimulate interest and provoke heated debate."

J. Maureen Henderson of Forbes.com said that Shechter's work "tackles one of the last taboos in our culture’s discussion of sex – the deliberate decision not to participate in it.” Lena Corner of The Guardian wrote that "It’s refreshing to hear such forthright voices in a world where any debate about virginity is often so conflicting or one-sided." Jennifer Wadsworth of SFGate.com remarked that the project is "More than just a narrative about virginity. It’s about the connection of storytelling and how hearing about other people’s experience can make anyone else feel less alone in theirs."
