= Flex Your Rights =

Flex Your Rights (Flex) was a 501(c)(3) educational non-profit organization that aimed to educate the public about how basic Bill of Rights protections apply during encounters with law enforcement. Flex Your Rights created and distributed media that explains individuals' legal rights during a police encounter. The organization operated from 2002 until it closed on December 31, 2023."

== History ==
Flex was founded by Steven Silverman in 2002 and was based in Washington, D.C. Silverman created Flex in response to what he perceived as widespread confusion over the basic rules of search and seizure. Silverman came to this conclusion while he worked as a campus organizer for the campaign to repeal the Higher Education Act’s aid-elimination penalty, which denies financial aid to students with drug convictions.

Flex Your Rights closed on December 31, 2023, and its website and videos remain available as an archive.

== Videos ==
=== BUSTED: The Citizen's Guide to Surviving Police Encounters ===
In 2003, Flex secured funding from the Marijuana Policy Project grants program to create its first docudrama, BUSTED: The Citizen’s Guide to Surviving Police Encounters, hosted by Ira Glasser, past executive director of the American Civil Liberties Union. The film illustrates scenarios of police encountering citizens in various situations and how the relevant civil rights should be asserted in regards to the Fourth, Fifth and Sixth Amendments of the Constitution of the United States.

=== 10 Rules for Dealing with Police ===
Flex produced 10 Rules for Dealing with Police, a docudrama that focuses on the concerns of communities of color.

== Controversies ==
In May 2010, two Norview High School teachers of Norfolk, Virginia were placed on paid administrative leave after screening Busted to their 12th grade Government class. A parent complained to the Norview administration that her daughter had come home from school and said, "You won't believe what we are learning in Government. They are teaching us how to hide our drugs." Norview's spokeswoman Elizabeth Thiel Mather said division leaders are currently investigating the incident over concerns that the materials were unauthorized.

== Activism ==
Flex collaborates with community activists to fight new policing schemes that violate citizens' Bill of Rights protections. Successes include victories against D.C. Mayor Adrian Fenty's Safe Homes Initiative and an attempt by the Washington Metropolitan Area Transit Authority to implement random searches of Metro passengers.
