= Times Like These =

Times Like These may refer to:

== Songs ==
- "Times Like These" (Foo Fighters song), 2003, and a Live Lounge Allstars charity single, 2020
- "Times Like These" (Five Finger Death Punch song), 2022
- "Times Like These" (Addison Rae song), 2025
- "Times Like These", a 2010 song by Jack Johnson from the album Download to Donate for Haiti
- "Times Like These", a 2010 song by Kid Rock from the album Born Free

== Albums ==
- Times Like These (Gary Burton album), 1988
- Times Like These (Rick Danko album), 2000
- Times Like These (Buddy Jewell album), 2005
- Times Like These (Friday Hill album), 2006
- Times Like These (Austins Bridge album), 2010

== See also ==
- In Times Like These, a 1991 novel by Zee Edgell
- "In Times Like These" (song), by Barbara Mandrell, 1983
- In These Times (disambiguation)
