= National Socialist Party of America v. Village of Skokie =

National Socialist Party v. Skokie
- Supreme Court of the United States

Decided June 14, 1977
- Full case name: National Socialist Party of America et al. v. Village of Skokie
- Docket no.: 76-1786
- Citations: 432 U.S. 43 (more) 97 S. Ct. 2205; 53 L. Ed. 2d 96; 1977 U.S. LEXIS 113; 2 Media L. Rep. 1993

Case history
- Subsequent: On remand, Vill. of Skokie v. Nat'l Socialist Party of Am., 51 Ill. App. 3d 279, 366 N.E.2d 347 (1977); affirmed in part, reversed in part, 69 Ill. 2d 605, 373 N.E.2d 21 (1978).

Holding
- If a state seeks to impose an injunction in the face of a substantial claim of First Amendment rights, it must provide strict procedural safeguards, including immediate appellate review. Absent such immediate review, the appellate court must grant a stay of any lower court order restricting the exercise of speech and assembly rights.

Court membership
- Chief Justice Warren E. Burger Associate Justices William J. Brennan Jr. · Potter Stewart; Byron White · Thurgood Marshall; Harry Blackmun · Lewis F. Powell Jr. William Rehnquist · John P. Stevens

Case opinions
- Per curiam
- Concur/dissent: White
- Dissent: Rehnquist, joined by Burger, Stewart

Laws applied
- U.S. Const. amends. I, XIV

National Socialist Party of America v. Village of Skokie, 432 U.S. 43 (1977), arising out of what is sometimes referred to as the Skokie Affair, is a landmark decision of the Supreme Court of the United States dealing with freedom of speech and freedom of assembly. This case is commonly reviewed in constitutional law classes. Related court decisions are captioned Skokie v. NSPA, Collin v. Smith and Smith v. Collin. The Supreme Court ruled 5–4, per curiam, granting certiorari and reversing and remanding the Illinois Supreme Court's denial to lift the lower court's injunction on the NSPA's march. The ruling dictated that when citizens assert that their speech is being restrained, the matter must be reviewed immediately by the judiciary. By requiring the state court to consider the neo-Nazis' appeal without delay, the Supreme Court decision allowed the National Socialist Party of America to march in Skokie, although they did not do so.

== Background ==
Before the Skokie Affair, Frank Collin and his neo-Nazi group, the NSPA, would regularly hold demonstrations in Marquette Park, where the NSPA was headquartered. However, the Chicago authorities would eventually block these plans by requiring the NSPA to post a $350,000 public-safety insurance bond and by banning political demonstrations in the park. While Collin filed a lawsuit against the city of Chicago for a violation of his First Amendment rights, he realized that his case would be delayed in the courts for far longer than he was willing to wait to begin marching again.

On October 4, 1976, Collin sent letters to the park districts of the North Shore suburbs of Chicago, requesting permits for the NSPA to hold a white-power demonstration. While some suburbs chose to ignore his letters, Skokie—home to a significant number of Jewish people, many of them survivors of the Holocaust—chose to respond. At first, the Skokie mayor and village council intended to allow the NSPA to demonstrate and intended to ignore them in order to afford the NSPA as little publicity as possible. The Jewish community found this tactic unacceptable and held meetings to discuss the matter. The mayor and the village council heard their concerns, and on April 27, 1977, ordered village attorney Harvey Schwartz to seek an injunction.

In addition to filing an injunction, the village of Skokie passed three ordinances on May 2, 1977, in an attempt to prevent all future events similar to that which the NSPA wished to stage. One of the ordinances prohibited wearing military-style uniforms during demonstrations, and the two other ordinances prohibited the distribution of material containing hate speech and required a $350,000 insurance bond to hold a demonstration. These ordinances effectively prevented the NSPA from holding the event.

Collin used both the injunction and ordinances as an opportunity to claim infringement upon his First Amendment rights and subsequently wanted to protest in Skokie for the NSPA's right to free speech. On March 20, 1977, Collin notified the chief of police and park district of the NSPA's intention to protest for their right to free speech on May 1. In the letters, he stated that about 30–50 members planned to demonstrate outside of the village hall and that they planned to show signs demanding free speech for white men, including the phrases "White Free Speech", "Free Speech for White Americans" and "Free Speech for the White Men".

Collin sent another letter that contained the same details on June 22, 1977. The letter also stated that Collin was planning to stage a protest on the afternoon of July 4.

== Preceding lower-court cases ==
The case began in Cook County court when the Skokie town government successfully sued, under the caption Village of Skokie v. NSPA, for an injunction to bar the demonstration. On April 28, 1977, the town filed suit in Cook County circuit court for an emergency injunction against the march to be held on May 1, 1977. The injunction was granted, prohibiting marchers at the rally from wearing Nazi uniforms or displaying swastikas. On behalf of the NSPA, the American Civil Liberties Union (ACLU) challenged the injunction. The ACLU assigned civil rights attorneys David Goldberger and Burton Joseph to Collin's cases and argued that the injunction violated the First Amendment rights of the marchers to express themselves. The ACLU challenge was unsuccessful at the lower-court level.

The ACLU appealed on behalf of NSPA, but both the Illinois Appellate Court and the Illinois Supreme Court refused to expedite the case or to stay the injunction. The ACLU then appealed that refusal to the Supreme Court of the United States.

== Supreme Court ruling and subsequent cases ==
On June 14, 1977, the Supreme Court ordered Illinois to hold a hearing on their ruling against the National Socialist Party of America, emphasizing that "if a State seeks to impose a restraint on First Amendment rights, it must provide strict procedural safeguards, including immediate appellate review. ... Absent such review, the State must instead allow a stay. The order of the Illinois Supreme Court constituted a denial of that right." On remand, the Illinois Supreme Court returned the case to the appellate court, which ruled per curiam on July 11, 1977, that the swastika was not protected by the First Amendment. Thus the NSPA could march, but without displaying swastikas.

In its full review of the case, the Illinois Supreme Court focused on the First Amendment implications of the display of the swastika. Skokie attorneys argued that for Holocaust survivors, seeing the swastika was akin to being physically attacked. The Illinois Supreme Court rejected that argument, ruling that display of the swastika is a symbolic form of free speech entitled to First Amendment protections and determined that the swastika itself did not constitute "fighting words".

In parallel litigation in the federal courts, under the caption Collin v. Smith, the village's ordinance was declared unconstitutional, first by the district court and then by divided vote of the Seventh Circuit Court of Appeals. Over a published dissent by Justice Blackmun (joined by Justice White) detailing the history of the case and an overview of the issues involved, the U.S. Supreme Court denied further review.

== Effect of the decision ==
In the aftermath of the decision, the Holocaust Memorial Foundation of Illinois was founded in 1981. The foundation led to the creation of a museum in Skokie in 1984. In 2009, the Illinois Holocaust Museum and Education Center was built on Woods Drive.

Ultimately, the NSPA failed to march in Skokie and instead marched in Chicago, where they had gained permission. The litigation left undecided, at the Supreme Court level, whether such older precedents as Beauharnais v. Illinois and Terminiello v. City of Chicago remain authoritative statements of how the First Amendment applies to provocative and intimidating hate speech. According to former ACLU president Nadine Strossen, the case was part of a gradual process in the 20th century by which the Supreme Court strengthened First Amendment protections and narrowed the application of earlier decisions that had upheld restrictions of free speech, in part stemming from the realization that the Illinois restrictions on "hate speech" were so broad they could have been equally used to prohibit Martin Luther King Jr. demonstrations in Skokie.

== Cultural reference ==
This case is obliquely referenced in the 1980 film The Blues Brothers. In the film, Jake Blues asks a police officer, "Hey, what's going on?" The policeman bitterly replies, "Ah, those bums won their court case so they're marching today." To which Jake asks "What bums?" The officer replies, "The fucking Nazi Party." Elwood Blues then says "Pfft, Illinois Nazis. Pfft," to which Jake replies, "I hate Illinois Nazis."

The case was also featured in the 2020 documentary film Mighty Ira, which profiles the life and career of Ira Glasser, who defended the rights of neo-Nazis to rally in Skokie.

== See also ==
- Skokie (film)
- Beauharnais v. Illinois
- Brandenburg v. Ohio
- R.A.V. v. City of St. Paul
- Virginia v. Black
