= Herbert Foerstel =

American librarian and author (1933–2024)

Herbert N. Foerstel
- Foerstel in 1989
- Born: October 6, 1933; St. Louis, Missouri, U.S.
- Died: September 20, 2024 (aged 90); Baltimore, Maryland, U.S.

Herbert N. Foerstel (October 6, 1933 – September 20, 2024) was an American librarian and author known for his support of library privacy rights and his research into book banning.

== Early life and education ==
Foerstel was born in St. Louis, Missouri, the second oldest of five children of musicians William Herbert and Margaret Foerstel. His parents divorced when he was young and his mother remarried John Boe, a door-to-door encyclopedia salesman who later rose to be a corporate executive with P. F. Collier. The family moved frequently and Foerstel grew up in Indianapolis, Detroit, Los Angeles, Chicago and Long Island.

He received a Bachelor of Arts from Hamilton College in 1955 and an MLS from Rutgers University in 1959. He served in the U.S. Army from 1955 through 1958 working as a radar specialist. He later earned a master's degree in Science from Johns Hopkins University in 1970.

== Career ==
Foerstel started his career as a fine arts librarian from 1959 to 1966 at Towson State University. He then moved to be a science librarian at the University of Maryland at College Park, becoming head of the Engineering and Physical Sciences Library. He worked at UMD from 1967 through 1996. He was a member of board of directors of the National Security Archive at George Washington University and the Freedom to Read Foundation.

While working in libraries, Foerstel wrote a number of books about library censorship and privacy. Surveillance in the Stacks, The FBI's Library Awareness Program was an exposé of the history of the FBI's attempts to infiltrate libraries. Foerstel had met with FBI agents who visited UMD libraries looking for book-lending records of patrons with "Eastern European or Russian-sounding names." Foerstel did not feel comfortable complying with these requests. He did some research and took part in a Freedom of Information Act lawsuit, discovering that the FBI had been visiting science libraries in the United States for 13 years under a project which became known as the Library Awareness Program. He worked with the university to create and implement policies protecting patron records and later worked with Maryland legislators to advocate for legislation guaranteeing the privacy of all Maryland library records. That legislation was passed in 1988. In 1989 Foerstel discovered that as a result of his response to the FBI's inquiries he, himself, was investigated by them. Foerstel retired from his university work in 1996 and continued to write about First Amendment issues.

Banned in the U.S.A.: A Reference Guide to Book Censorship in Schools and Public Libraries looked at book-banning incidents from 1976 to 1992 and was later updated to include information about book bans, including interviews with authors and reviews of court cases, through 2000. The book included a Survey of Banned Books which contained annotated entries on the 50 most frequently challenged books from 1996 through 2000. Foerstel was outspoken against crusades to ban books, calling them strongly irrational.

== Personal life and death ==
Foerstal married Lenora Shargo, an art professor who he met while they were carpooling from their shared apartment building to Towson. The couple had three children. Lenora died in 2018. Herbert Foerstel died on September 20, 2024, at the age of 90.

== Honors and awards ==
Foerstal won a Hugh Hefner First Amendment Award in 1988. His 1991 book Surveillance in the Stacks was chosen by Choice as a Best Academic Book in 1990.

== Bibliography ==
- Surveillance in the Stacks: The FBI's Library Awareness Program, Greenwood Press, 1991. ISBN 9780313267154
- Secret Science: Federal Control of American Science and Technology, Praeger, 1993. ISBN 9780275944476
- Banned in the U.S.A.: A Reference Guide to Book Censorship in Schools and Public Libraries, Greenwood Press, 1994, revised edition, 2002. ISBN 9780313311666
- Climbing the Hill: Gender Conflict in Congress, Praeger (With Karen Foerstel), 1996. ISBN 9780275949143
- Free Expression and Censorship in America: An Encyclopedia, Greenwood Press, 1997. ISBN 9780313292316
- Banned in the Media: A Reference Guide to Censorship in the Press, Motion Pictures, Broadcasting, and the Internet, Greenwood Press, 1998. ISBN 9780313302459
- Freedom of Information and the Right to Know: The Origins and Applications of the Freedom of Information Act, Greenwood Press, 1999. ISBN 9780313285462
- From Watergate to Monicagate: Ten Controversies in Modern Journalism and Media, Greenwood Press, 2001. ISBN 9780944624449
- Refuge of a Scoundrel: The Patriot Act in Libraries, Libraries Unlimited, 2004. ISBN 9781591581390
- Killing the Messenger: Journalists at Risk in Modern Warfare, Praeger, 2006. ISBN 9780275987862
- The Patriot Act: A Documentary and Reference Guide, Greenwood Press, 2007. ISBN 9780313341427
- Toxic Mix?: A Handbook of Science and Politics, Greenwood Press, 2009. ISBN 9780313362347
- Studied Ignorance: How Curricular Censorship and Textbook Selection Are Dumbing Down American Education, Praeger, 2013 ISBN 9781440803239
