= Therese Shechter =

Writer and filmmaker

- Education: Ontario College of Art and Design; Columbia College Chicago; SUNY Empire State College
- Occupations: Filmmaker, writer and artist
- Known for: Feminist Documentary and Activism
- Website: https://trixiefilms.com

Therese Shechter is a filmmaker, writer and artist best known for the documentary films My So-Called Selfish Life, (2022), How to Lose Your Virginity (Women Make Movies, 2013), I Was A Teenage Feminist (Women Make Movies 2005), How I Learned to Speak Turkish (2006) and the short "#SlutWalkNYC" (2013). She is also the creator of "The V-Card Diaries," an online collection of over 300 stories of "sexual debuts and deferrals" submitted by readers. In 2013, the collection was featured in The Kinsey Institute's Juried Art Show.

Shechter's work challenges gender stereotypes, and how they affect women's lives and identity. her most recent documentary, My So-Called Selfish Life, is about the childfree movement, and she has written about the film's issues for Self, Real Simple, Topic, and other publications. She is also an advocate for comprehensive sex education and media criticism to combat misinformation about sex for teens and young people. Her production company, Trixie Films, is based in Brooklyn.

== Personal life and previous work ==
Shechter studied at the Ontario College of Art and Design (OCAD) in Toronto. She worked as an Art Director at the Toronto Star and then as Design Director for The Financial Times of Canada, edited by John Edward Macfarlane. Therese moved to Chicago to work at the Chicago Tribune, where she worked for nine years, rising to the position of Associate Graphics and Design Editor. She has won numerous awards from Society for News Design, the New York and Toronto Art Director's Clubs, and a Peter Lisagor award from the Chicago Headline Club. She also won big on the Canadian game show Split Second.

While at the Chicago Tribune, she attended Columbia College in Chicago, studying film and video. Shechter left Chicago for New York City in order to pursue her interest in film and work for Robert De Niro's company Tribeca Productions as assistant to Jane Rosenthal. After leaving Tribeca Productions, Therese volunteered at the Sundance Film Festival, which she cites as having changed her view of the documentary genre and filmmaking in general. When Shechter returned from Sundance, she enrolled in a documentary workshop with filmmaker Macky Alston at Union Theological Seminary. She worked as a researcher on his film Questioning Faith, and Alston continued to mentor Shechter as she filmed her first feature I Was A Teenage Feminist (2005).

Through her production company, Trixie Films, she continues to explore feminist issues as they pertain to reproductive justice, sexuality, and gender roles. Shechter frequently lectures on the college circuit, screening her films for audiences across the U.S., Canada, and internationally. She has participated as a panelist at the American Public Health Association, The Guttmacher Institute, and Harvard's Rethinking Virginity Conference. Her work has been covered by publications such as The Guardian, The Chicago Tribune, and Dua Lipa's newsletter Service 95, and she has offered expert commentary for Literary Hub, The Globe and Mail, and the Tampa Bay Times

== Feature films ==
=== My So-Called Selfish Life (2022) ===
In 2016, Shechter began her new documentary film, My So-Called Selfish Life which premiered at the Woodstock Film Festival in 2021. The film explores the concept of being "childfree by choice" by documenting the lives of women and men who are "choosing not to have kids in a culture where motherhood feels mandatory." Subjects of the film include poet and biographer Molly Peacock, author of Paradise, Piece by Piece, Israeli Sociologist Dr. Orna Donath, multi-media artist and rapper Shanthony Exum, and journalist Anne Kingston, who wrote about maternal regret for Maclean's Magazine. The official Facebook page for the film, which Shechter created and manages, has over 11,000 followers. The film was released in 2022 on demand worldwide.

=== How to Lose Your Virginity (2013) ===
In the documentary film, How to Lose Your Virginity, Shechter explores how the concept of virginity affects the lives of men and women through interviews and personal narrative. The film details the historical, political and religious construction of virginity as well as its place in modern pop culture. "How to Lose Your Virginity" had its U.S. premiere at DOC NYC in Fall 2013 and its U.S. Broadcast premiere on Fusion in February 2014. International screenings and film festivals have taken place in Tel Aviv, Haifa, Croatia, Turkey, Chile, Canada, the Czech Republic and Korea.

=== I Was A Teenage Feminist (2005) ===
Shechter's first feature-length film I Was A Teenage Feminist examines the discomfort a growing number of young people feel in identifying themselves as feminists. She uses her own personal journey as the driving force of the film while she interviews past and present feminist icons as well as women and men struggling for and against the concept of feminism. The film won Best Film at the Jewish Women's Film Festival and Special Mention at the Karachi International Film Festival.

== Short films ==
=== #SlutWalkNYC (2013) ===
In "#SlutWalkNYC", Shechter documents the controversial global, grassroots anti-rape movement on the day it filled the streets of New York City. This short debuted at the 2013 Hamptons International Film Festival, and screened at Barnard College in 2013 and the Athena Film Festival in 2014.

=== The End (2010) ===
The End is a silent, 16mm and hand-cut narrative short film about a woman attempting to end a relationship with a persistent suitor. The full film is available on Vimeo via Trixie Films.

=== How I Learned to Speak Turkish (2006) ===
Shechter filmed "How I Learned to Speak Turkish" as a chronicle of her own growing obsession with Turkish language and culture as she navigates new relationships with Turkish men. The documentary examines cultural clichés, the male gaze and the idea of the exotic other. The film won the Short Documentary Jury Prize at the Atlanta Film Festival in 2006.

=== Womanly Perfection (2003) ===
Shechter's animated short film examines "the nature of beauty and womanhood through the lens of fashion magazines." The full film was released on Vimeo via Trixie Films.

== Other work ==
=== "The V-Card Diaries" ===
An ongoing project, "The V-Card Diaries" is a crowd-sourced collection of sexual experiences curated on the Internet. The interactive story-sharing site gives readers a chance to anonymously submit personal narratives. The submissions detail positive sexual encounters as well as many instances of slut-shaming, older virginity and sexual assault. "The V-Card Diaries" was developed over the course of two POV Hackathons - PBS-sponsored events where web developers are paired with artists and activists for multimedia creation. The project was featured in The Kinsey Institute's Juried Art Show (2013) as their first interactive installation.

=== Writing ===
Shechter has written articles for a variety of publications, most notably: Chicago Tribune, Women's Media Center, Nerve, Talking Points Memo, Women & Hollywood, Adios Barbie, Bitch Magazine, Girl With Pen, Film Independent Magazine.

For many years, she wrote a companion blog to her feature film How to Lose Your Virginity. The blog covered virginity-related issues in the news, purity culture, uses of the concept in pop culture and media, and published stories submitted via "The V-Card Diaries."
