= Fatherhood USA =

1998 three-part mini-series by Marion Lipschutz

- Directed by: Marion Lipschutz; Rose Rosenblatt
- Produced by: Marion Lipschutz; Rose Rosenblatt
- Narrated by: Bill Bradley
- Release date: 1998
- Country: United States

Fatherhood USA is a three-part mini-series originally broadcast nationally on PBS in 1998. It was produced and directed by Marion Lipschutz and Rose Rosenblatt of Incite Pictures. The program, hosted by Senator Bill Bradley, seeks to dispel common stereotypes of fatherhood, and examine how fathers are able to build strong relationships with their children.

== Overview ==
The feature is broken into three segments:

=== Program I: Dedicated, Not Deadbeat ===
This looks at low-income fathers, and is narrated by Yaphet Kotto. This section examines common stereotypes of fatherhood: absent fathers, unmarried fathers, deadbeat dads, and considers different ways in which fathers working against histories of fatherlessness, neglect, poverty, and incarceration can still remain present in the lives of their children.

=== Program II: Juggling Family and Work ===
This section looks at fathers balancing work with family life, and is narrated by John Shea. Examining the lives of men from around the country, this program focuses on the daily struggle of men in workplaces that are not "father friendly," and touches on the issues of making workplaces family-friendly for both mothers and fathers.

=== Program III: Video Modules and Workbook ===
This portion is designed to facilitate discussion among groups watching the program. It contains a series of brief vignettes. The themes of the video modules are:

- The Importance of Fathers
- Father-Mother Communication
- Juggling Work and Family
- Fathers and Social Support
