= Live Free or Die (2000 film) =

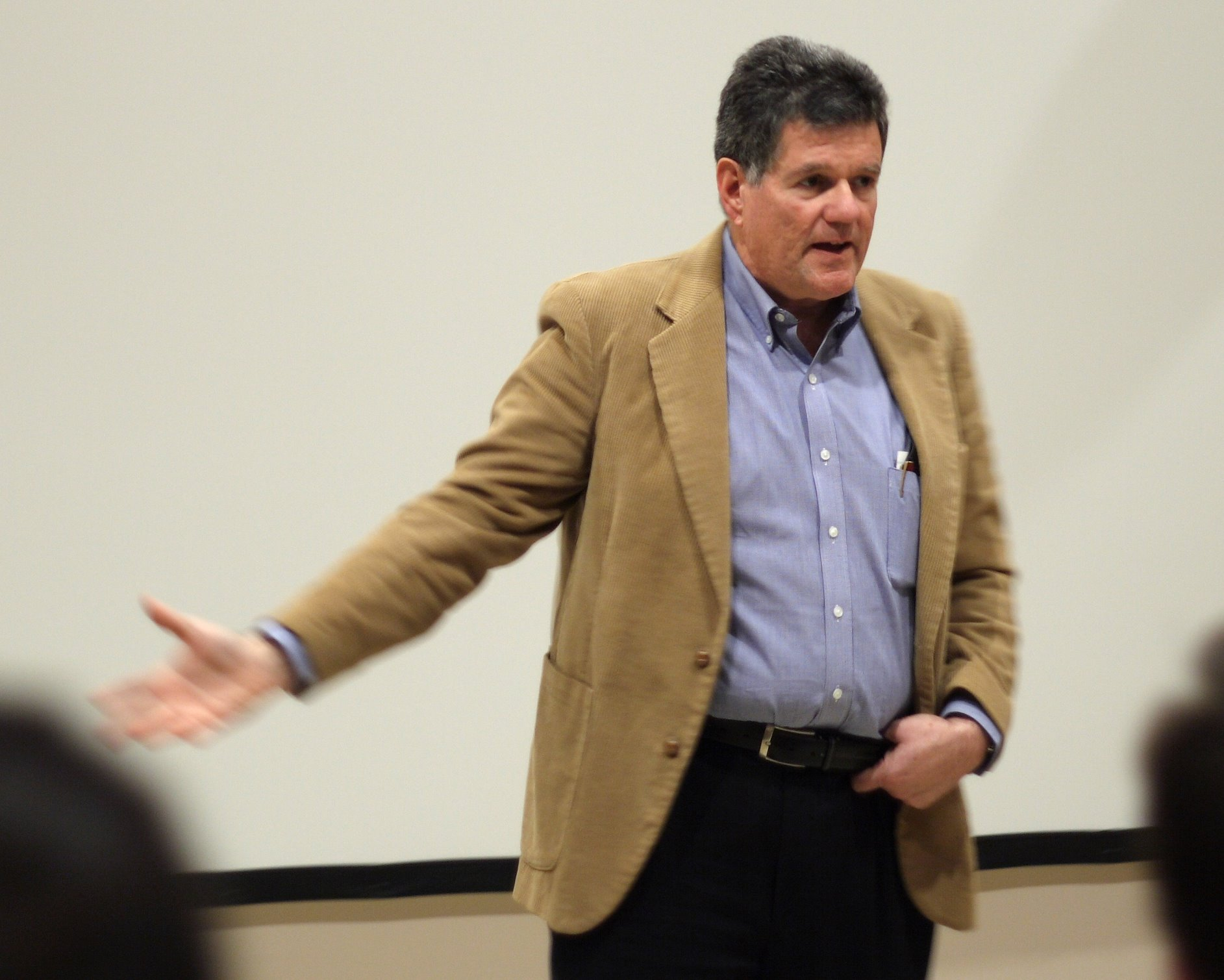
- Goldner in 2007, giving a talk about his experiences with abortion rights activism
- Directed by: Marion Lipschutz; Rose Rosenblatt
- Produced by: Marion Lipschutz; Rose Rosenblatt
- Production company: Incite Pictures
- Release date: 2000
- Running time: 70 minutes

Live Free or Die is a 2000 documentary film that follows Dr. Wayne Goldner, a New Hampshire OBGYN fighting on the latest front of the "abortion wars". The feature originally aired as part of PBS' POV series. It was directed and produced by Marion Lipschutz and Rose Rosenblatt of Incite Pictures.

== Overview ==
Set against the backdrop of Goldner's own community, the film captures a year of daily struggles and moral conflict. In the documentary, Wayne challenges a Catholic hospital merger that greatly reduces the area's services. When a patient who is 14 weeks pregnant is barred from the hospital operating room, Goldner is forced to send her on an 80-mile cab ride for an emergency abortion. Goldner's greatest conflict, as depicted in the film, is reducing the tension caused by his presence in the community.

== Political conflict in the film ==
In his hometown, protesters target Goldner as a physician who provides abortion care and succeed in getting him dismissed as a sex education teacher from a local school. The conflict moves to the center of community politics when Goldner applies to be reinstated by the local school board. After a wide-ranging dispute, the board denies his request. The film concludes that doctors like Wayne Goldner often stop providing abortions because of the "profound sense of isolation they endure." The film aim is to show that, more than violence, it is a lack of social support for abortion providers that has left 86% of counties in the US without abortion service.
