= I Was a Teenage Feminist =

- Directed by: Therese Shechter
- Written by: Therese Shechter
- Produced by: Barbara Barde
- Edited by: Carole Larsen
- Distributed by: Women Make Movies
- Release date: March 8, 2005 (W Network)
- Running time: 62 minutes
- Countries: Canada; United States
- Language: English

I Was A Teenage Feminist is a Canadian documentary film directed by Therese Shechter, produced by UpFront Productions and distributed by Women Make Movies. The title is a play on that of the 1957 horror movie, I Was a Teenage Werewolf. The film explores the marked discomfort among many young, progressive women to identify themselves as feminists and how that discomfort came to be. Through personal narrative as well as interviews with feminist icons and everyday women and men, Shechter's film documents a complex, multi-generational look at feminist identity in today's world. The film had its television premiere on March 8, 2005 (International Women's Day) Canada's W Network, and it won Best Film at the National Council of Jewish Women Film Festival and Special Mention at the Karachi International Film Festival in 2006.

== Synopsis ==
I Was A Teenage Feminist examines how and why an uneasiness with the word "feminist" has developed among modern, young women. Throughout the film, Shechter expresses her own struggle with identity as it relates to modern feminism and past iterations of the feminist movements. To illustrate Shechter's beginnings as the titular Teenage Feminist, the film uses music and scenes from "Free to Be... You and Me", archival footage from dated educational movies and home videos of Shechter as a teenager.

The film analyzes the history of feminism as well as its impact on modern culture through interviews with well-known academics and activists such as: Gloria Steinem, Letty Cottin Pogrebin, Elaine Alvarez, Jennifer Pozner, Jennifer Baumgardner, Nancy Scibilia and the NYC Radical Cheerleaders. I Was A Teenage Feminist also contains on-the-street style interviews with men and women in New York City, capturing candid discussions on the word "feminist." Shechter incorporates her own family members and friends, documenting how their opinions of feminism have changed over time.

The soundtrack includes music by Ani DiFranco, Lavababy, Gina Young, Moxie Starpark and "I Am Woman", in versions sung by both Helen Reddy and Farrell Burk.

== Production ==
Therese Shechter directed and produced the film through her production company, Trixie Films. Other documentaries produced by Trixie Films include the feature How to Lose Your Virginity and the shorts How I Learned to Speak Turkish and #SlutWalkNYC. Trixie Films is currently based in Brooklyn, NY.

I Was A Teenage Feminist began production in 2001, originally as part of an assignment for a documentary film course at Union Theological Seminary taught by filmmaker Macky Alston. She filmed the movie over the next 4 years in New York, Washington D.C., Chicago and Toronto. In 2003, she pitched the work-in-progress at Hot Docs' Toronto Documentary Forum, which led to a production and broadcast partnership with UpFront Productions and the W Network.

== Use in Education and Festival History ==
I Was A Teenage Feminist is frequently screened at colleges across the globe as part of Gender & Women's Studies courses. Notable screenings include Duke University (2005), The American Center of New Delhi (2009) and the New Humanist House of Sydney (2013).

In addition, the film has screened at American and international film festivals such as: In Other Words (Portland, 2013), 10th International Women's Film Festival (Seoul, 2008), Cinema Politica Film Series (Dublin, 2010 & 2015), Karachi International Film Festival (Karachi, 2006) and the National Council of Jewish Women Film Festival.

== Critical reception ==
Bitch Magazine said of the film, "Evidence that feminism - whether second wave, third wave or no wave - hasn't ceased to be a vital, many-hued movement with something to offer women of any age."

The St. John's International Women's Film Festival wrote, "This film should be a primer for every Women's Studies student, but it is so wise and lively that you should bring along your fathers, brothers and boyfriends."

Danielle Kraten of Ms Magazine wrote, "The '50s horror movie-style title of Therese Shechter's documentary isn't accidental: The 40-year-old feminist saw younger women all but shriek in fear and run to escape the so-called f-word."

John Doyle of The Globe and Mail reviewed the film as "cheerful and straightforward."

Danielle Devereaux of The Scope wrote that "Shecter's quest to find feminism reveals that social movements, like identities, are never simple."
