= The Education of Shelby Knox =

The Education Of Shelby Knox
- Directed by: Marion Lipschutz; Rose Rosenblatt
- Produced by: Marion Lipschutz; Rose Rosenblatt
- Starring: Shelby Knox
- Cinematography: Gary Griffin
- Music by: Rick Baitz
- Distributed by: Women Make Movies Incite Pictures
- Release date: January 2005 (Sundance Film Festival)
- Running time: 76 minutes
- Language: English

The Education of Shelby Knox is 2005 American documentary film that tells the coming-of-age story of public speaker and feminist Shelby Knox, a teenager who joins a campaign for comprehensive sex education in the high schools of Lubbock, Texas. TEOSK was an official selection of the Sundance Film Festival in 2005 and aired on PBS’ P.O.V. series that same year. It was directed and produced by Marion Lipschutz and Rose Rosenblatt.

== Overview ==
Lubbock has some of the highest teen pregnancy and STD rates in the nation, the "solution" to which is a strict abstinence-only sex education curriculum in the public schools and a conservative preacher who urges kids to pledge abstinence until marriage.

Shelby Knox is a deeply religious Southern Baptist teenager who joins the Lubbock Youth Commission, a group of high school students representing a youth voice in city government. When the teens confront Lubbock's sexual health crisis and campaign for comprehensive sex education, Knox throws herself into the battle with missionary fervor, struggling to reconcile her newfound political beliefs with her conservative religious views. When the campaign broadens to include a fight for a gay-straight alliance, Knox must confront her family and pastor in this coming-of-age story.

== Awards ==
The Education of Shelby Knox has received a number of awards:

- 2005 Sundance Film Festival (Excellence in Cinematography, Documentary Category)
- 2005 SXSW Film Festival (Audience Award)
- 2005 Sonoma Valley Film Festival (Jury Prize)
- 2005 Miami Gay & Lesbian Film Festival (Jury Prize, Best Documentary)
- 2005 Full Frame Documentary Film Festival (Emerging Pictures Audience Award)
- Council on Foundations (2005 Henry Hampton Award for Excellence in Film & Digital Media)
- 2005 Fresno Reel Pride Film Festival (Audience Award, Best Feature)
- 2006 The Index on Censorship's Freedom of Expression Film Award (Nominee)

== Shelby Knox in the News ==
The Dixie Chicks' 2006 album Taking the Long Way features a track titled "Lubbock or Leave It", which is based on The Education of Shelby Knox. When the song came out, the group's member Emily Robison told the press: "We'd seen a documentary called The Education of Shelby Knox, which was about a girl ... trying to get Lubbock to teach sex education in the schools. Lubbock has one of the highest rates of teen pregnancy and STDs in the U.S., so it really showed what happens when you keep that information away from people." Lead singer Natalie Maines, who is from Lubbock, subsequently spoke (during a 2006 episode of VH1 Storytellers) about watching the film and drawing from her own experiences of living there to write the song.

In the 2013 documentary How to Lose Your Virginity, scenes from The Education of Shelby Knox are featured alongside interviews with Shelby Knox.

As of June 2011, Shelby Knox is living in New York City and serving as the Director of Organizing, Women's Rights for Change.org.
