= Ira Glasser =

Former director of the American Civil Liberties Union

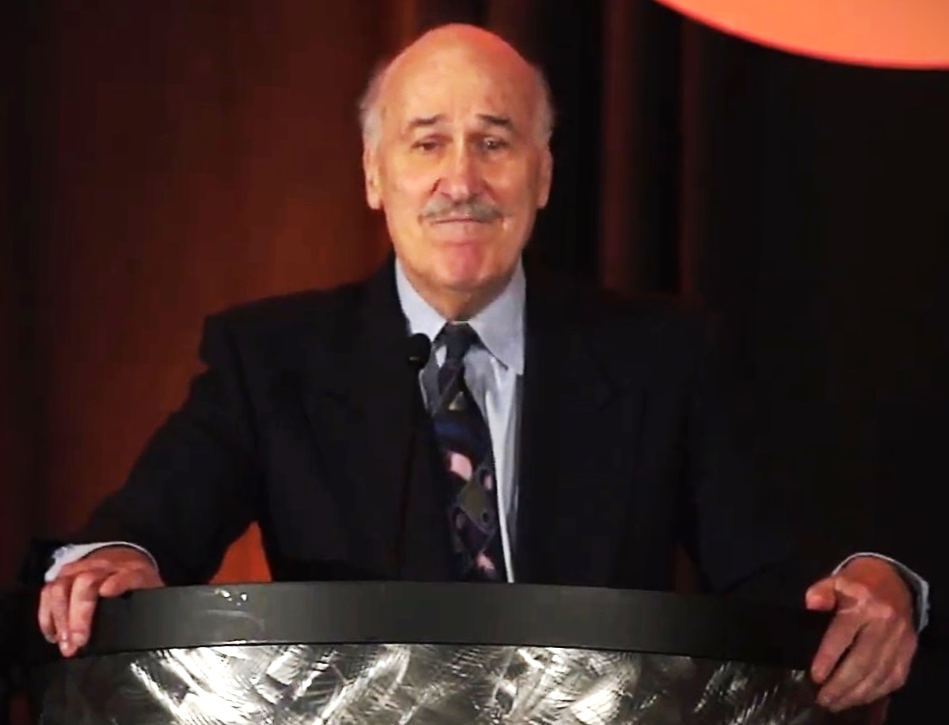
- Glasser receiving the Richard J. Dennis Drugpeace award in 2015

Executive Director of the American Civil Liberties Union
- In office 1978–2001
- President: Norman Dorsen; Nadine Strossen
- Preceded by: Aryeh Neier
- Succeeded by: Anthony D. Romero

Personal details
- Born: April 18, 1938 (age 88) New York City, U.S.
- Education: Queens College (BS); Ohio State University (MS); New School

Ira Saul Glasser (born April 18, 1938) is an American civil liberties activist who served as the fifth executive director of the American Civil Liberties Union (ACLU) from 1978 to 2001. His life is the subject of the 2020 documentary Mighty Ira.

== Early life and education ==
Ira Glasser was born on April 18, 1938, at Brooklyn Jewish Hospital in Brooklyn, New York. He earned a graduate degree in mathematics from Ohio State University.

== Early career ==
In the early 1960s, Glasser taught mathematics at Queens College (CUNY) and Sarah Lawrence College. From 1963 to 1967, he was the editor of Current magazine. In 1967, Glasser joined the New York Civil Liberties Union as associate director. In 1970 he became the NYCLU's executive director, in which capacity he served until he became the executive director of the American Civil Liberties Union in 1978.

== Executive director ==
The ACLU website credits Glasser with transforming the American Civil Liberties Union "from a 'mom and pop'-style operation concentrated mainly in a few large cities to a nationwide civil liberties powerhouse." At the end of Glasser's directorship the ACLU maintained staffed offices in all 50 states, the District of Columbia, and Puerto Rico; when he became director in 1978, only about half of the states had staffed offices. Glasser raised the ACLU's annual income from $4 million in 1978 to $45 million in 1999.

Although the ACLU had protected civil liberties generally through litigation, Glasser expanded the focus of the ACLU's activities through lobbying and public education programs.

Glasser retired in 2001; he was succeeded as executive director of the ACLU by Anthony D. Romero.

In his retired life, Glasser serves as the president of the board of directors of the Drug Policy Alliance.

== Publications ==
- Doing Good: The Limits of Benevolence (co-author, 1978)
- Visions of Liberty: The Bill of Rights for All Americans (1991)
- BUSTED: The Citizen's Guide to Surviving Police Encounters (narrator) – Produced by Flex Your Rights
- Why we must fight for the right to hate. (author, 21st January 2023) - Published in Spiked.
