= Burton Joseph =

American civil rights attorney

- Born: Burton Allen Joseph; May 30, 1930; Chicago, Illinois, U.S.
- Died: March 31, 2010 (aged 79); San Francisco, California, U.S.
- Occupation: Lawyer
- Known for: First Amendment and free speech litigation

Burton Allen Joseph (May 30, 1930 – March 31, 2010) was an American civil rights attorney. He represented clients in free speech cases, and represented the American Library Association in its suit that ultimately found the Communications Decency Act unconstitutional. He pushed the American Civil Liberties Union of Illinois to represent the National Socialist Party of America, an offshoot of the American Nazi Party, in its desire to march in Skokie, Illinois. That case resulted in National Socialist Party of America v. Village of Skokie, 432 U.S. 43 (1977), a Supreme Court opinion that determined the Party had the right to march.

Joseph was a partner at Joseph, Lichtenstein & Levinson, a Chicago law firm, and also defended demonstrators arrested at the Democratic National Convention in Chicago in 1968. Born in Chicago, his parents ran a business caretaking Jewish cemeteries. Joseph obtained his undergraduate degree from the University of Illinois, graduated from DePaul law in 1952 and started his practice in Chicago soon thereafter. Among his many clients was the Comic Book Legal Defense Fund. In addition to his legal work, he was the executive director of the Playboy Foundation, the charitable arm of Playboy Enterprises, for nine years. He was an adjunct professor at the Chicago–Kent College of Law for ten years.
