= Allison Stanger =

American political scientist and academic

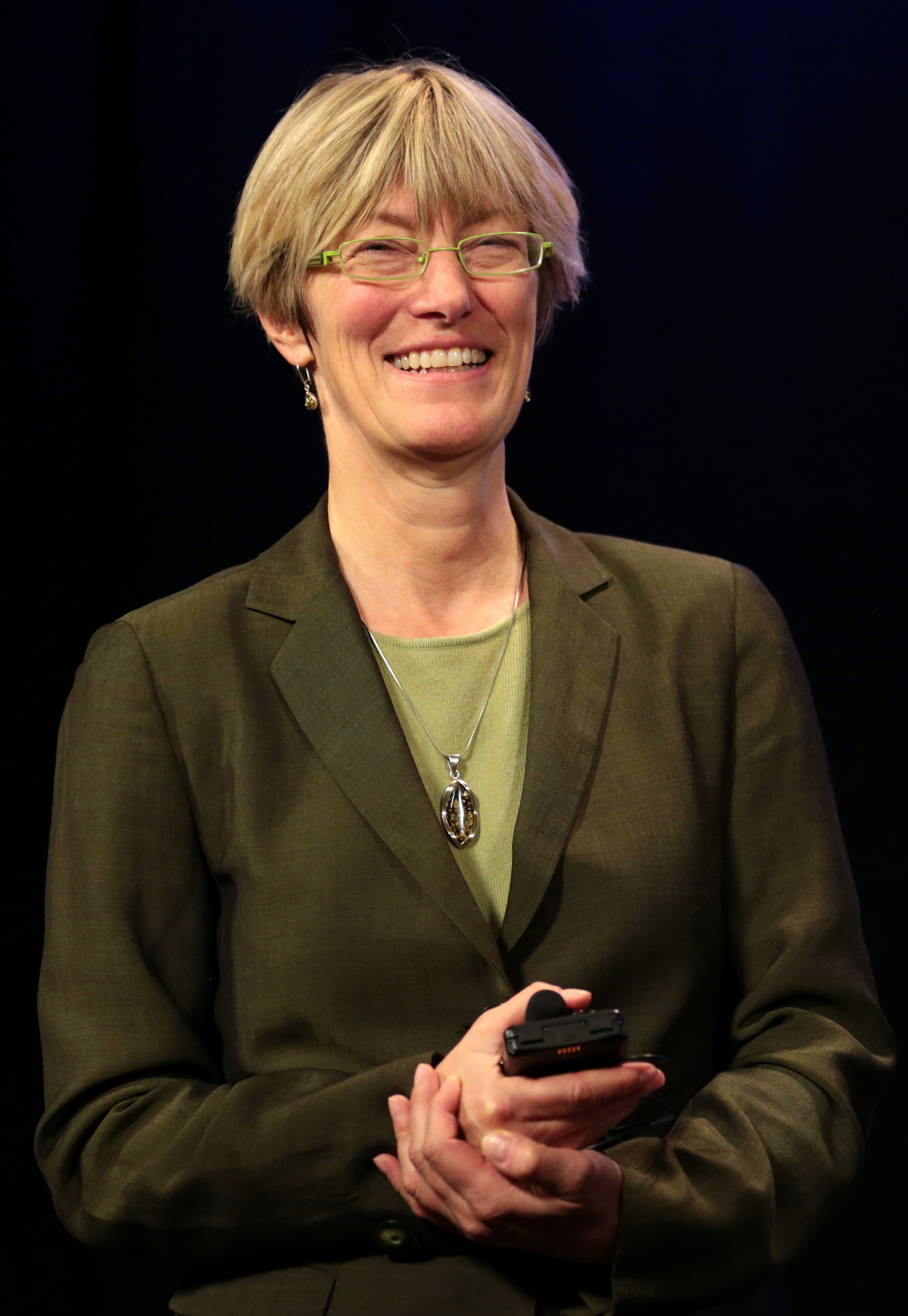
- Occupations: Professor, political scientist, consultant
- Awards: Merle Fainsod Prize (1986)

Academic background
- Education: Ball State University (BS); London School of Economics (GradD); Harvard University (AM, PhD)

Academic work
- Discipline: international relations and foreign policy
- Institutions: Middlebury College

Allison Katherine Stanger is an American political scientist and the Russell J. Leng '60 Professor of International Politics and Economics at Middlebury College, Vermont and the founding director of Middlebury's Rohatyn Center for International Affairs. Stanger has been a member of the Council on Foreign Relations since 2004, and between 2009 and 2011 she worked as a part-time consultant to the United States Secretary of State's Policy Planning Staff.

== Education ==
Stanger graduated in 1982 with a Bachelor of Science in actuarial science and mathematics from Ball State University. In 1983, she earned a graduate diploma in economics from the London School of Economics. In 1986, she won the Merle Fainsod Prize for academic promise. In 1988, she earned an A.M. in Soviet Union regional studies from Harvard University, where she also completed her Ph.D. in political science in 1991.

== Career ==
Stanger began her career as a risk management analyst with The Equitable Life Assurance Society from 1983 to 1984. Her first academic appointment was as an assistant professor of political science at Middlebury College in 1991. Stanger was the recipient of several research fellowships and grants between 1991 and 1995, focusing on Eastern European languages and foreign policy studies. From 1995 to 1996, she was a visiting scholar at Prague's Charles University. She has held a succession of academic positions in political economy, geopolitics and international affairs at Middlebury, including chairman of the Department of Political Science from 2009 to 2012.

Stanger was the director of Middlebury College's Geonomics Center for International Studies from 1999 to 2002. She was the founding director of the Geonomics Center's successor, the Rohatyn Center for Global Affairs, from its inception in 1999 until her resignation in July 2012.

Stanger's current research focuses on the relationship between technology, the law, and politics. She is a faculty member at Middlebury College, teaching undergraduate courses such as "Politics of Virtual Realities", "Democracy in America", "Political Development of Western Europe", and "American Foreign Policy". Stanger is also a Cybersecurity Fellow with New America.

She is currently a IWM Digital Humanism Fellow.

=== Publications and media ===
Stanger wrote Irreconcilable Differences? Explaining Czechoslovakia's Dissolution in 2000.

In her book, One Nation Under Contract: The Outsourcing of American Power and the Future of Foreign Policy, published in 2009, Stanger argues that poor oversight of U.S. government contractors in Afghanistan and Iraq has squandered American resources, exacerbating domestic unemployment and deficit problems. Stanger has published op-eds about hidden costs due to outsourcing U.S. diplomacy and economic development in the Financial Times, International Herald Tribune, The New York Times, and The Washington Post. In 2010, she testified before the Commission on Wartime Contracting, the Senate Budget Committee, and the Congressional Oversight Panel.

Stanger is writing two new books, titled Consumers Versus Citizens: How the Internet Revolution is Remaking Global Security and Democracy's Public Square and Who Elected Big Tech?

=== Assault at Middlebury College ===
On March 2, 2017, Stanger accompanied political scientist Charles Murray as his academic escort to a Middlebury College speaking engagement on campus at Wilson Hall. She was injured outside the McCullough Student Center during an attack by protesters attempting to obstruct and damage the vehicle she and guest speaker Murray were riding in as they left the campus. Stanger was diagnosed with a concussion as a result of the assault. The next day, Middlebury College President Laurie L. Patton confirmed that the protesters' behavior "[inside and outside Wilson Hall] was in clear violation of Middlebury College policy".

External videos
- Q&A interview with Stanger on her experiences related to the Charles Murray guest speaking incident, October 29, 2017, C-SPAN

Some students (and faculty) felt that by refusing to allow Murray to speak, and by injuring Stanger, the Middlebury College student community "trod all over the ideas of free speech this country was founded upon".

Patton later issued a statement, saying the school would conduct an investigation into the sequence of events and then determine what actions to take for those individuals who were involved. Patton also said that the Middlebury Police Department would investigate the violent confrontation outside McCullough.

== Personal life ==
Stanger is married to Michael Kraus, professor of political science at Middlebury, and has two children. She speaks, to varying levels of fluency, Czech, French, English, and Russian. Stanger was a Delegate from New York at the Democratic National Convention in 1984.

== Books ==
- Complexity Economics, (co-edited with W. Brian Arthur and Eric Beinhocker) (Santa Fe Institute Press, 2020).
- Whistleblowers: Honesty in America from Washington to Trump, Yale University Press, 2019 ISBN 978-0300186888.
- One Nation Under Contract: The Outsourcing of American Power and the Future of Foreign Policy Yale University Press, 2009 ISBN 978-0300152654.
- Irreconcilable Differences? Explaining Czechoslovakia's Dissolution (co-edited and co-translated with Michael Kraus), Foreword by Václav Havel, Rowman and Littlefield, 2000 ISBN 978-0847690213.

== Congressional testimony ==
- Testimony before the Congressional Oversight Panel, “Hearing on Treasury's Use of Private Contractors on TARP” – September 22, 2010
- Testimony before the Senate Budget Committee, Hearing on “Responsible Contracting: Modernizing the Business of Government” – July 15, 2010
- Testimony before the Commission on Wartime Contracting, Hearing on “Are Private Contractors Performing Inherently Governmental Functions?” – June 18, 2010
