= Mighty Ira =

- Directed by: Nico Perrino, Aaron Reese, Chris Maltby
- Distributed by: Foundation for Individual Rights and Expression
- Release date: October 9, 2020
- Running time: 99 minutes
- Country: United States

Mighty Ira is a 2020 documentary film by Nico Perrino, Aaron Reese, and Chris Maltby. The film profiles the life and career of Ira Glasser, who was executive director of the American Civil Liberties Union (ACLU) from 1978 to 2001.

The movie focuses on Glasser's advocacy for free speech and racial justice, as well as his defense of the rights of neo-Nazis to rally in the Chicago suburb of Skokie, Illinois in the 1970s, which at the time was home to many Holocaust survivors. It also covers Glasser's unlikely friendship with William F. Buckley Jr. and his upbringing as a fan of the Brooklyn Dodgers baseball team.

== Production ==
The idea for Mighty Ira first originated in 2017, after Perrino met Glasser in New York City at the funeral of writer and jazz critic Nat Hentoff. The film was produced by Perrino and his Foundation for Individual Rights and Expression colleagues Reese and Maltby. Perrino, a millennial, said that he helped create the film because he felt his generation didn't understand why Glasser's generation fought for free speech rights.

The name "Mighty Ira" comes from a line in a poem written by one of Glasser's ACLU colleagues, read at the end of the film. The title of the poem, "Ira at the Bat", is a play on the famous "Casey at the Bat" poem by Ernest Lawrence Thayer that includes a line about "mighty Casey."

== Release ==
Because of the COVID-19 pandemic, the filmmakers decided to forgo taking Mighty Ira on the film festival circuit and instead released it through Angelika Film Center's virtual cinema program in October 2020. The movie was later made available on streaming platforms, such as Amazon Prime Video and Apple TV+.

Glasser appeared on The Joe Rogan Experience and Real Time with Bill Maher to promote the film.

== Reception ==
=== Critical reception ===
Mighty Ira received generally positive reviews. The Hollywood Reporter called the movie "a warm portrait that poses ever-urgent questions," while journalist Matt Taibbi noted that it is "elegant and thought-provoking." Spiked claimed the film is "a long-overdue tribute to a civil-liberties hero." Matt Fagerholm, writing for RogerEbert.com, gave Mighty Ira a more mixed review, awarding it 2.5 out of 4 stars.

The film attracted interest from Jewish publications, where it received favorable reviews focusing on the film's treatment of the Skokie case and Glasser's relationship with 96-year-old Holocaust survivor (and former Skokie resident) Ben Stern.

=== Film festivals ===
Mighty Ira won the grand prize at the 2021 Anthem Film Festival. It was also awarded "Best Documentary Feature Film" at the 2021 Lake Travis Film Festival.
