= Marion Lipschutz =

American film director

Marion Lipschutz is an American documentary producer, writer, and director. Lipschutz has directed and produced award-winning documentaries, including BEI BEI, The Education of Shelby Knox and Young Lakota.

Marion Lipschutz works alongside Rose Rosenblatt as the co-director and producer of Incite Pictures the for profit arm of Cine Qua Non(a not for profit). She produces and directs feature documentaries that entertain, educate and explore critical contemporary issues.

== Cine Qua Non ==
Lipschutz co-directed and produced the 1997 PBS documentary The Abortion Pill, a documentary about the controversial French drug RU-486. Lipschutz co-directed and produced, Fatherhood USA, a three-part series looking at fatherhood in the nineties. The documentary aired on PBS in 1998 and was hosted by Senator Bill Bradley. She also produced and directed Greta Holby, a profile of a 50-year-old Ford fashion model and opera producer for IN THE PRIME which aired on PBS in 1998.

Her 2000 documentary Live Free or Die, which she co-directed and edited, aired as a part of PBS' POV series. The film took an inside look at the life of a doctor who performs abortions. In 2001 Lipschutz co-produced CODE BLUE: New Orleans. This documentary medical series consisted of four programs: Rite of Passage; Long Way Home; Close Calls; Witching Hour, and appeared on the New York Times Television for The Learning Channel.

Her other films include The Education of Shelby Knox, which received several awards. It earned Excellence in Cinematography in the documentary category in at the Sundance Film Festival, the audience award at the SXSW Film Festival, the jury prize at both the Sonoma Valley Film Festival and the Miami Gay & Lesbian Film Festival. The Emerging Pictures Audience Award at the Full Frame Documentary Film Festival, and the Council on Foundations awarded the film the Henry Hampton Award for Excellence in Film & Digital Media. In 2006 the film was nominated for The Index on Censorship's Freedom of Expression Film Award.

Lipschutz co-directed and produced the documentary in 2013 Young Lakota. The film follows the emotional journey of Sunny Clifford, a young Lakota woman who returns home to the Pine Ridge Reservation with a dream of changing the world around her. The film earned multiple awards at various film festivals including Best Dakota Feature Documentary at the South Dakota Film Festival and Best Documentary at the Red Nation Film Festival and the Smithsonian Native Cinema Arts Festival. The film was the official selection at the Santa Fe Independent Film Festival, The American Indian Film Festival, the New Orleans Film Festival, as well as the BIG SKY Documentary Film Festival and the CUCALORUS Film Festival. The film also received the jury award for Best Documentary at the CINE LAS AMERICAS International Film Festival.

== Early career ==
Lipschutz began her career as a documentary film researcher and video workshop instructor in New York City schools. She researched early American cinema, including a series by Noel Burch called What Do These Old Films Mean?, a broadcast series on the history of entrepreneurship, the PBS series American Cinema.

She started producing/directing with the award-winning Hard Choices, about a "rustbelt" steel town devastated by the closing of its local mill. She associate produced an HBO special on AIDS, she worked for HBO on several America Undercover shows and the Real Sex series covering everything from strippers with MBA's to lethal violence in the workplace.

== Awards ==
- The Audience Award at SXSW
- The Emerging Picture Award at the Full Frame Documentary Film Festival
- The Full Frame Documentary Film Festival Women in Leadership Award
- The Hugh M. Hefner First Amendment Award
- Excellence in Cinematography at The Sundance Film Festival
- Nomination for the British Index on Censorship's Freedom of Expression Award
- The Jury Prize for Best Documentary at The Miami Gay and Lesbian Film Festival

== Selected filmography ==
- BEI BEI (Coming Soon)
- Young Lakota (2013)
- The Education of Shelby Knox (2005)
- Live Free or Die (2000)
- Fatherhood USA (1998)

== Selected print works ==
- The Boundaries of Sex, Style, and Status by Amy C. Wilkins. 2008
- The Continuum Companion to Religion and Film by William L. Blizek. 2009
- Moral Panics, Sex Panics: Fear and the Fight Over Sexual Rights by Gilbert Herdt. 2009
- The Feminist Philosophy Reader by Alison Bailey, Chris Cuomo. 2008
- Making Documentary Films and Videos: A Practical Guide to Planning, Filming, and Editing Documentaries by Barry Hampe. 2007

== Education ==
- New York University, MA in cinema studies, Department Fellowship, Paulette Goddard Scholarship, Alumni Key Award.
- Vassar College, BA in English, cum laude, Phi Beta Kappa.

== Reviews ==
Marion's work with Incite pictures has been called "unique and memorable," "pure gold," and "balanced and truthful," by the Milwaukee Journal, Hollywood Reporter and The New York Times, respectively. The Washington Post wrote, "their fly-on-the-wall approach fulfills one of the glorious promises of documentary – to put us in the middle of situations we otherwise might never be in."

== Book Features ==
The Shut Up and Shoot Documentary Guide: A Down & Dirty DV Production By: Anthony Q. Artis

The Documentary Film Makers Handbook: A Gorilla Guide By: Genevieve Jolliffe & Andrew Zinnes

"Documentary films can now be shot professionally using cheaper equipment, and smaller cameras enable the documentarian to be less intrusive and therefore more intimate in the subjects' lives. The Documentary Film Makers Handbook will be an essential resource for anyone who wants to know more about breaking into this exciting field."
