= In These Times =

In These Times may refer to:

- In These Times (magazine), an American monthly magazine of news and opinion
- In These Times (Peter, Paul, and Mary album), a 2003 album by Peter, Paul, and Mary
- In These Times (Makaya McCraven album), a 2022 album by Makaya McCraven

== See also ==
- These Times (disambiguation)
- Times Like These (disambiguation)
