= Incite Pictures =

Incite Pictures is a documentary film production company located in New York City, founded by Rose Rosenblatt and Marion Lipschutz Incite Pictures is the for profit arm of Cine Qua Non, a non-profit organization. In addition to national U.S. broadcasts, their work has been broadcast on the CBC's Passionate Eye in Canada, the BBC in England, NHK, Indian TV (several broadcaster), and many other strands around the world. Their films have won Best Cinematography at The Sundance Film Festival, The Audience Award at SXSW, The Audience and Jury Award at Cine Las Americas, Best Documentary at Red Nation Film Festival, Best Documentary at Native Cinema Showcase, The Emerging Picture Award at Full Frame, and The Jury Prize for Best Documentary at The Miami Gay and Lesbian Film Festival. Personal recognition includes The Full Frame Women in Leadership Award, The Hugh M. Hefner First Amendment Award, and a nomination for the British Index on Censorship's Freedom of Expression Award. Though their topics have been specific to the United States, they have durable international appeal, showing in hundreds of festivals, including The Human Rights Watch Film Festival, Hot Docs, The Stockholm International Film Festival, The Seoul International Film Festival and The Festival de Rio de Janeiro.

== Films ==
- Young Lakota (2013) follows the emotional journey of Sunny Clifford, a young Lakota woman who returns home to the Pine Ridge Reservation with a dream of changing the world around her. Her political awakening begins when the tribe's first female president, Cecelia Fire Thunder, defies a South Dakota law banning abortion by threatening to build a women's clinic on the reservation. Embroiled in a controversial political season that hinges on reproductive rights and tribal sovereignty, Sunny, her twin sister Serena, and their neighbor Brandon are drawn into a political firestorm that changes the course of their lives. Premiered on PBS Independent Lens in November 2013 during Native American Heritage Month.
- The Education of Shelby Knox (2005) is a coming of age story of teenager in Lubbock, Texas who transforms from a conservative, abstinence until marriage pledging Southern Baptist to a Democratic feminist and supporter of gay rights.
- Live Free or Die (2000) is the portrait of a small town OB/GYN that explores the radical decline in the number of doctors performing abortions, as well as the impact of Catholic hospital mergers on the provision of abortion services. Aired as a POV special in 2000 with a town hall and Internet component that generated the most extensive on-line discussion in the history of POV programming.
- Fatherhood USA (1998) is a mini-series that created portraits of fathers from very different walks of life: a teen dad struggling to break a cycle of fatherlessness; a factory worker discovering that he, too, can be involved with raising his daughters; and a CFO juggling the demands of a high powered executive wife and two small children. Hosted by former Senator Bill Bradley, the program aired nationally.
- The Abortion Pill (1997) is a one-hour special that followed the long and controversial journey of the abortion pill (RU486) to the U.S. market. Tracking its use from France to England, India, Brazil and finally to the U.S., the program shows how a potent mix of business, politics and ethics made the pill a symbolic linchpin in the so-called abortion wars. Aired nationally.
