= Free Speech, "The People's Darling Privilege" =

Book by Michael Kent Curtis

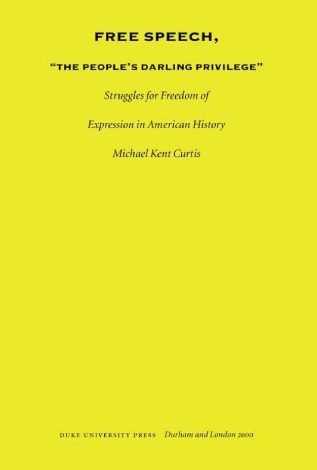
- Book cover
- Author: Michael Kent Curtis
- Language: English
- Subject: Freedom of Speech
- Genre: Law
- Publisher: Duke University Press
- Publication date: 2000
- Publication place: United States
- Pages: 520
- ISBN: 0-8223-2529-2
- Preceded by: No State Shall Abridge

Free Speech, "The People's Darling Privilege": Struggles for Freedom of Expression in American History is a non-fiction book about the history of freedom of speech in the United States, written by Michael Kent Curtis and published in 2000 by Duke University Press. The book discusses the evolution of free speech in the U.S. within the context of actions of individuals and how they affected change. The author writes that protests and actions by citizens helped to evolve the notions surrounding free speech in the U.S. before definitive statements on the matter from U.S. courts. Curtis writes that free speech rights were first developed in "the forum of public opinion," and that, "The history of free speech shows the need for broadly protective free speech rules applied generally and equally."

For his work on Free Speech, "The People's Darling Privilege," Curtis received the Hugh M. Hefner First Amendment Award and the Mayflower Cup Award. Critics gave the book a positive reception. A review in Columbia Journalism Review called it a "rich and original study," and The Journal of American History said that it includes "fine analytic discussions." Perspectives on Political Science called the book "an extremely valuable contribution to the literature addressing the history of free speech in America." Timothy C. Shiell of the University of Wisconsin–Stout reviewed it for The Historian and wrote, "Michael Kent Curtis offers a major contribution to the scholarship of both that era and of free speech."

== Author ==
Curtis' previous book, No State Shall Abridge: The Fourteenth Amendment and the Bill of Rights, was published in 1986. The Journal of Information Ethics said that before the book's publication, Curtis had "written quite extensively on the subject" of freedom of speech, and cited articles in Constitutional Commentary (1995), and Wake Forest Law Review (1996). With J. Wilson Parker, Davison Douglas, and Paul Finkelman, Curtis served as editor of the 2003 work, Constitutional Law in Context. In 2002, Curtis was a professor of law at Wake Forest University, where he taught American legal and constitutional history, free speech law, and constitutional law. In 2004, Curtis was a professor of Public and Constitutional Law at the Wake Forest University.

== Contents ==
Structured in chronological order, Free Speech, "The People's Darling Privilege" discusses the development of free speech through controversies, which arose during the history of the United States. These include the Quasi-War with France, the 1798 Alien and Sedition Acts, conflict regarding speech related to abolitionism and criticism of slavery, and speech related to criticism of the American Civil War. Curtis discusses the efforts of abolitionists Elijah Lovejoy and Hinton Helper.

The book discusses in detail, attempts by U.S. President Abraham Lincoln, to curtail free speech during the American Civil War. He comments on the ways attitudes about free speech affected events in history related to this period of time, "The weakness of the popular free-speech tradition (especially in the South) encouraged violence that did not end with the Civil War ... [but was] revived during Reconstruction to silence those who supported civil and political rights for blacks". Curtis discusses conflict involving people related to these historical events, including editors, political activists, and politicians. The author discusses advocates of free speech before the recognition of this right in the U.S. court system.

Curtis writes that despite the actions of the government, it is the actions of individuals through speech and protest that allow democracy to function appropriately. The author states that, "again and again, people in power have treated speech that advocated lawful change through democratic process as an incitement to lawless action". Curtis says that free speech rights in the U.S., which at present are believed to be given through 20th century court rulings, were actually developed first in "the forum of public opinion". He says, "The history of free speech shows the need for broadly protective free speech rules applied generally and equally".

He writes that during the 18th and 19th centuries in the U.S., protests by individuals and the press predated court judgments regarding the development of free speech. The author says, "as Madison had expected, constitutional guarantees of liberty do their work at popular levels as well as at the level of institutions such as the Supreme Court of the United States, state supreme courts, Congress, and state legislatures. Popular views limit and channel both legislation and private action, each of which can either constrain or empower speech". Curtis says that, "The similarity of current suppression theories to those of the past suggests caution. Historic attempts to use these ideas to suppress democratic discussion of positive social change should make us wary of attempts to resurrect them for benevolent purposes".

== Reception ==
=== Awards and honors ===
For his work on the book, Michael Kent Curtis was recognized with the Hugh M. Hefner First Amendment Award, which recognizes contributions to the First Amendment. He also received the Mayflower Cup Award, which honors the best non-fiction work by an individual from North Carolina, from the North Carolina Literary and Historical Association.

=== Reviews ===
an extremely valuable contribution to the literature addressing the history of free speech in America.

— Perspectives on Political Science

In a review of the book for the Columbia Journalism Review, James Boylan said Curtis' work is a "rich and original study". Reviewing the book for The Journal of American History, Michael P. Zuckert called it a "very fine book" that is "gracefully written and engaging to read". He said, "After Curtis's book, nobody should be able to say that the Bill of Rights was unlikely to be on the minds of the drafters of the Fourteenth Amendment." Zuckert wrote, "Sprinkled into the stories are fine analytic discussions."

Writing in Perspectives on Political Science, Paul Weizer described the book as "an extremely valuable contribution to the literature addressing the history of free speech in America." Weizer said, "Although there are countless books on the theories behind the speech guarantee embedded in our Constitution, Curtis brings a fresh perspective. Most First Amendment books begin with Supreme Court decisions from the early 1900s; Curtis reminds us that modern ideas about the protection of expression originated much earlier." As to the writing quality of the book, Weizer wrote, "The first hundred years of American history are rich with stories such as this. Curtis does an outstanding job of bringing them to life. He is to be commended for keeping editorial comments to a minimum and allowing the participants to make his points for him. The book is painstakingly documented to provide first-person accounts from sources such as newspapers and town meetings." Weizer recommended the book for those researching the subject matter, writing, "For specialists on free speech issues, the book provides remarkable detail."

In a review for The Historian, Timothy C. Shiell of the University of Wisconsin–Stout wrote, "In providing the first detailed history of free speech from the Sedition Act of 1798 to the Fourteenth Amendment of the 1860s, Michael Kent Curtis offers a major contribution to the scholarship of both that era and of free speech." Shiell wrote on the views put forth by the author in the book, "Curtis does not limit this erudite work to historical narration. He also addresses political and legal movements and ideas that influenced and were influenced by free-speech controversies such as theories of democracy, justifications for broad protections of free speech, and the doctrines of content neutrality and heckler's veto. His treatment of justifications for suppression is especially valuable." Shiell concluded his review writing, "For at least these three reasons—the historical detail, the review of relevant legal and political theory, and the lessons from history—this book is a 'must read' for anyone interested in the period from 1798 to 1870 or in the development of free-speech theory and practice in the United States."

Gordon Moran reviewed the book for the Journal of Information Ethics, writing, "In this book, Prof. Curtis ... provides a thorough account of the evolution of free speech, in theory and practice, from pre-Revolutionary times through the Civil War and the Fourteenth Amendment (1868). As a history book, it is worthy of being in the library of every high school, college, and university that teaches American history, and would also be very useful and instructive as a textbook for university courses in American studies and advanced courses in American history." In a review for The Journal of Southern History, William Pannill wrote, "This is more a work of history than of law. Although the author summarizes the reasoning of legislatures and courts that overrode the First Amendment, he does not analyze the unfolding of constitutional doctrines." Pannill concluded, "At 437 pages of text, the book is too long. The writing suffers from repetition. For example, the author reminds us again and again that the southern states feared that debates over slavery would lead to slave revolts-one time was sufficient to make the point. The chapters also jump around in time and subject. Pruning and redrafting would have improved the book for a wider audience. The story certainly deserves one."

In his book Freedom of Speech: A Reference Guide to the United States Constitution, author Keith Werhan placed Free Speech, "The People's Darling Privilege" among "leading works on free speech" during the American Civil War. Werhan noted that the book includes "excellent discussions" of the Alien and Sedition Acts. In addition to Werhan, Steven J. Heyman's book Free Speech and Human Dignity also recommended Free Speech, "The People's Darling Privilege" for "leading works" on freedom of speech. Author Margaret Kohn recommended Free Speech, "The People's Darling Privilege" as a resource, "for extensive examples of the courts' willingness to countenance restrictions on speech", in her book Brave New Neighborhoods: The Privatization of Public Space.

In Free Expression and Democracy in America: A History, Stephen M. Feldman classed the book among "helpful sources on the history of free speech". Writing in Lincoln's Censor: Milo Hascall and Freedom of the Press in Civil War Indiana, David W. Bulla wrote, "Curtis showed how freedom of the press has both functional and formal protections". Judge Andrew P. Napolitano recommended Curtis' book in his books The Constitution in Exile, and Constitutional Chaos, writing, "Michael Kent Curtis offers an excellent and detailed account of the troubled affair between Clement Vallandigham and Abraham Lincoln in this work."

In Constitutional Democracy: Creating and Maintaining a Just Political Order, Walter F. Murphy wrote that Curtis "beautifully detailed" an incident when the U.S. Post Office refused to deliver abolitionist writings through their service. In his book Eloquence and Reason: Creating a First Amendment Culture, Robert L. Tsai recommended Curtis' book, "for an account of antebellum debates over the scope of the First Amendment". In her book Licentious Gotham: Erotic Publishing and Its Prosecution in Nineteenth-Century New York, Donna Dennis recommended Free Speech, "The People's Darling Privilege", "for evidence of commitment to freedom of speech and freedom of press among abolitionists".

== See also ==
- Censorship in the United States
- First Amendment to the United States Constitution
- Freedom of speech by country
- Freedom of Speech (painting)
- Freedom of speech in the United States
- Freedom of the press
