= Anthony D. Romero =

American activist

Anthony Romero
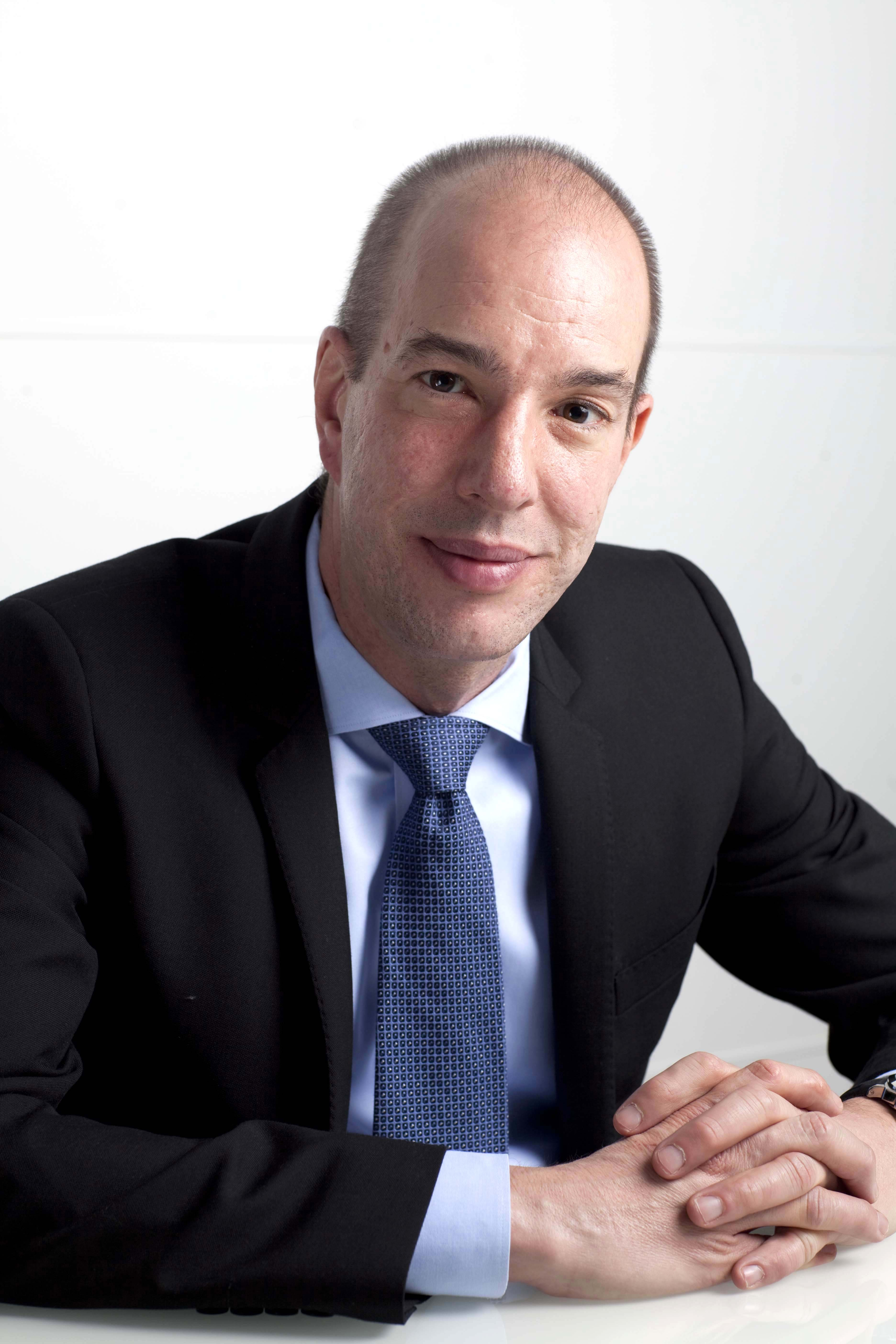
- Romero in 2011

6th Executive Director of the American Civil Liberties Union
- Incumbent
- Assumed office September 2001
- President: Nadine Strossen; Susan Herman; Deborah Archer
- Preceded by: Ira Glasser

Personal details
- Born: July 9, 1965 (age 61) New York City, U.S.
- Education: Princeton University (BA); Stanford University (JD)

Anthony David Romero (born July 9, 1965) is an American lawyer who serves as the executive director of the American Civil Liberties Union. He assumed the position in 2001 as the first Latino and openly gay man to do so.

== Early life and education ==
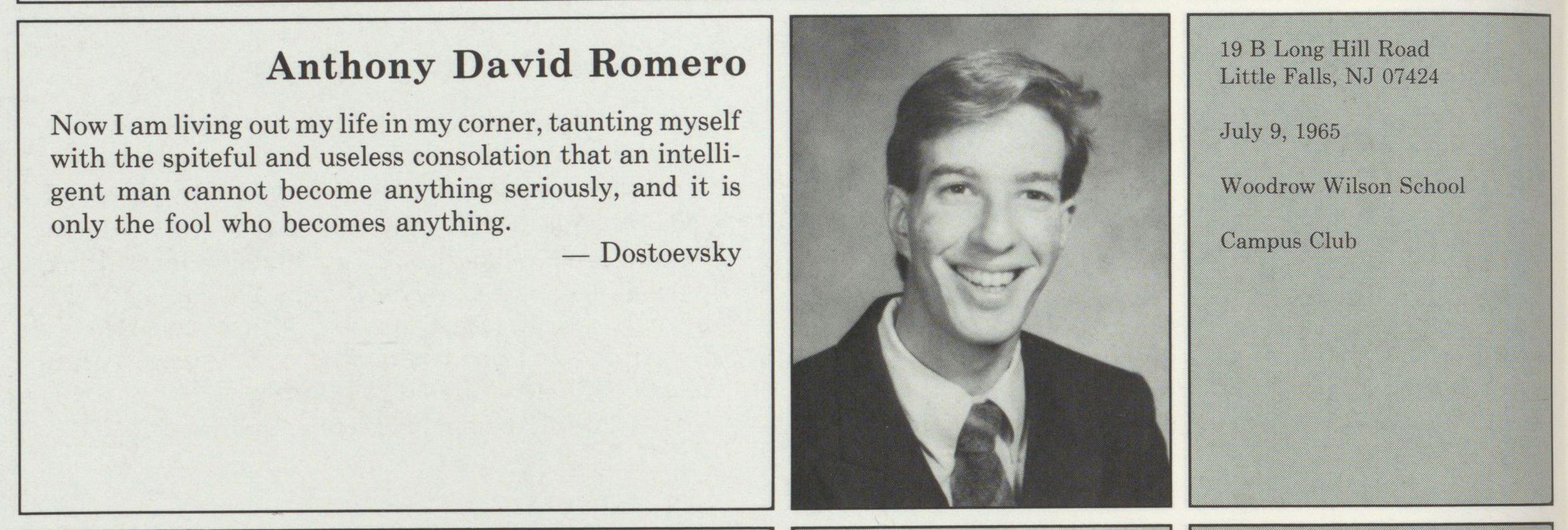
Romero in the Princeton University yearbook, 1987

Romero was born on July 9, 1965, in the Bronx, New York City, to Puerto Rican parents Demetrio and Coralie Romero. He grew up in a public housing project in the Bronx. His father worked at a Manhattan hotel and was initially denied higher-paying work as a banquet waiter due to limited English proficiency. After filing a grievance with his labor union's attorney, his father won the case. The family later moved to New Jersey, where Romero completed high school.

Romero was the first member of his family to graduate from high school. He received his B.A. degree from Princeton University's Woodrow Wilson School of Public and International Affairs in 1987, having written a senior thesis titled "Colombian Migration and Political Participation in the United States". He later received a J.D. from Stanford Law School in 1990. He was a Dinkelspiel Scholar at Stanford University, a Cane Scholar at Princeton, and a National Hispanic Scholar at both institutions. He is a member of the New York bar.

== Early career ==
Romero started his career at the Rockefeller Foundation, notably leading a foundation review that helped determine future directions in civil rights advocacy. In 1992, Romero began working for the Ford Foundation, initially serving as a program officer in the Civil Rights and Social Justice Program. After less than four years in that position, he was promoted to the position of director, making him one of the youngest directors in the foundation's history. Prior to his departure, he served as the director of Human Rights and International Cooperation, transforming the program into the foundation's largest. As director, he managed and facilitated roughly $90 million in grants to civil rights, human rights, and peace projects. Notably, he also launched progressive initiatives in affirmative action, voting rights and redistricting, immigrants' rights, women's rights, reproductive freedom, and LGBT rights.

== American Civil Liberties Union ==
Romero became executive director of the American Civil Liberties Union (ACLU) one week before the September 11 attacks. He was the first Latino and the first openly gay man to hold this position in the organization's history.

Following 9/11, he launched the Keep America Safe and Free campaign, focusing on protecting civil liberties during the post-9/11 crisis. He and the ACLU fought court cases related to the Patriot Act, exposed detainee abuse in U.S. custody, and challenged the Bush administration’s National Security Agency (NSA) spying program. Romero also helped establish the John Adams Project to support military defense lawyers at Guantánamo.

Amidst 9/11 related concerns, ACLU membership, which had hovered around 300,000 for decades, increased to 573,000 following the terror attacks and subsequent legislation established during the Bush administration. Total donations to the ACLU doubled to more than twice the 2001 budget, increasing to about $28 million per year in the years following. In each of the ACLU's national affiliate offices, Romero hired and placed at least one staff attorney.

The ACLU's massive growth under Romero's leadership allowed for the organization to expand its activities with regard to racial justice, religious freedom, privacy rights, reproductive freedom, and LGBT rights.

In 2007, Romero and the ACLU denounced the Pentagon for monitoring 186 antiwar protests and keeping files on pacifist groups, from Veterans for Peace to the Catholic Worker Movement.

Romero spoke at the March for Women's Lives in Washington, D.C. Video courtesy of Crystal Pyramid Productions.

In 2008, Romero spoke at the March for Women's Lives in Washington, D.C., advocating for the legality of abortion.

In 2013, Romero, on behalf of the ACLU organization, praised Edward Snowden for his whistleblowing action against the NSA.

In 2016, Romero co-signed a letter to UN Secretary-General Ban Ki-moon calling for a more humane drug policy, along with people like Eve Ensler, Norman Lear, and Ernesto Zedillo.

== Criticisms ==
During the course of his time with the ACLU, Romero has come under fire by other leaders within the organization, including board members and his predecessor, Ira Glasser. Their complaints have included assertions of his dishonesty and lack of integrity in the context of the workplace and with regard to the ACLU's work. His critics within the ACLU have launched websites such as savetheaclu.org and voicesfortheaclu.org, reporting that he "has betrayed fundamental ACLU values".

In 2002, Romero signed a consent decree with the New York Attorney General at the time, Eliot Spitzer, to settle a privacy breach that had been discovered on the ACLU website. Although an outside company was responsible for the breach, Spitzer's office had demanded $10,000 from the ACLU for the error, which would later be reimbursed by the outside company directly responsible. However, as designated in the decree, Romero was required to distribute the decree itself to the national ACLU board within 30 days. Instead, he waited 6 months to do so, when he reportedly "offered vague and inconsistent explanations of the circumstances surrounding the negotiation, execution, and eventual distribution of the agreement".

In 2004, Romero received criticism for signing two agreements without the consent or approval of the larger ACLU leadership council. Most notable of the two was his signing of the Combined Federal Campaign, a government program that allows federal employees to allocate funds to charities and nonprofits that do not "knowingly employ" people found on federal and international antiterrorism watch lists. Fellow leadership did not approve of this partnership and were forced to withdraw from the program, a move that cost the organization roughly $500,000.

On June 26, 2011, Romero was charged with a DWI after being seen "careening into oncoming traffic" by police. His arrest was not included in any weekly press releases of DWI charges that week and was not made public until it was published in the New York Post on August 10, nearly two months later. Police claim to have inadvertently omitted Romero's arrest. However, critics suggested that the omission was no accident.

== Works authored by Romero ==
- In Defense of Our America: The Fight for Civil Liberties in the Age of Terror. William Morrow, 2007. ISBN 0-06-114256-5.

== Recognition ==
In 2005, he was named one of Time magazine's 25 Most Influential Hispanics.

In 2009, he received the Golden Plate Award of the American Academy of Achievement presented by Awards Council member Archbishop Desmond Tutu at an awards ceremony at St. George's Cathedral in Cape Town, South Africa.

In 2011, Romero received the "Maggie" Award, highest honor of the Planned Parenthood Federation, in tribute to their founder, Margaret Sanger.

He was featured in the HBO documentary The Latino List.

Romero is the recipient of the 2020 Woodrow Wilson Award from Princeton University.

In August 2026, Romero received the American Bar Association's Thurgood Marshall Award, becoming the first Hispanic recipient of the honor.
