= Rose Rosenblatt =

American film director

Rose Rosenblatt is an American producer, director, editor, and writer of documentary films. She directed and edited the Sundance award winningThe Education of Shelby Knox (2005); and Young Lakota (2013).

Rosenblatt works alongside Marion Lipschutz as the co-director and producer of Incite Pictures, the for-profit arm of Cine Qua Non. She directed and edited the documentary on Bei Bei Shuai released in 2019.

== Cine Qua Non ==
Rosenblatt co-directed and produced the 1997 PBS documentary The Abortion Pill, a documentary about the controversial French drug RU-486. Rosenblatt co-directed and produced, Fatherhood USA, a three-part series looking at fatherhood in the nineties. The documentary aired on PBS in 1998 and was hosted by Senator Bill Bradley.

Her 2000 documentary Live Free or Die, which she co-directed and edited, aired as a part of PBS' POV series. The film took an inside look at the life of a doctor who performs abortions. In 2001 Rosenblatt produced and edited CODE BLUE: New Orleans. This documentary medical series consisted of four programs: Rite of Passage; Long Way Home; Close Calls; Witching Hour, and appeared on the New York Times Television for The Learning Channel.

Her other films include The Education of Shelby Knox, which received several awards. It earned Excellence in Cinematography in the documentary category in 2005 at the Sundance Film Festival, the audience award at the SXSW Film Festival, the jury prize at both the Sonoma Valley Film Festival and Miami Gay & Lesbian Film Festival, The Emerging Pictures Audience Award at Full Frame Documentary Film Festival, and the Council on Foundations awarded the film the Henry Hampton Award for Excellence in Film & Digital Media. In 2006 the film was nominated for The Index on Censorship's Freedom of Expression Film Award.

Rosenblatt co-directed and produced the documentary in 2013 Young Lakota. The film follows the emotional journey of Sunny Clifford, a young Lakota woman who returns home to the Pine Ridge Reservation with a dream of changing the world around her. The film earned multiple awards at various film festivals including Best Dakota Feature Documentary at the South Dakota Film Festival and Best Documentary at the Red Nation Film Festival and the Smithsonian Native Cinema Arts Festival. The film was the official selection at the Santa Fe Independent Film Festival, the American Indian Film Festival, the New Orleans Film Festival, as well as the BIG SKY Documentary Film Festival and the Cucalorus Film Festival. The film also received the jury award for Best Documentary at the CINE LAS AMERICAS International Film Festival.

Her latest film on Bei Bei Shuai is currently in post-production. Bei Bei Shuai, a Chinese immigrant living in Indianapolis, was charged with murder and attempted feticide for committing suicide while pregnant.

== Early career ==
Rosenblatt began her career as a grants and script writer. In 1982 she co-wrote The Two Worlds of Angelita with Jose Santiago, a film was about a Puerto Rican family that migrates to New York. It played at Carnegie Hall Cinema and aired on PBS. In 1983, Rosenblatt co-wrote for A Spy in the House of Love. Rosenblatt worked as the sound editor for David Mamet’s Things Change (1987) and Homicide (1991).

In 1991, Rosenblatt produced and edited Rights and Wrongs, a one-hour pilot for a PBS series on human rights issues around the world. That same year she was the supervising editor for the 60 minute special Mandela in America. Rosenblatt also served as an editor for The Human Language (1988-1990) series. The three part series on linguistics aired on PBS in February of 1994, and was produced by Gene Searchinger, of Equinox Films from 1988 to 1990.

== Awards ==
- The Audience Award at SXSW
- The Emerging Picture Award at Full Frame Documentary Film Festival
- The Full Frame Documentary Film Festival Women in Leadership Award
- The Hugh M. Hefner First Amendment Award
- Best Cinematography at The Sundance Film Festival
- Nomination for the British Index on Censorship’s Freedom of Expression Award
- The Jury Prize for Best Documentary at The Miami Gay and Lesbian Film Festival

== Selected filmography ==
- BEI BEI (Coming Soon)
- Young Lakota (2013)
- The Education of Shelby Knox (2005)
- Live Free or Die (2000)
- Fatherhood USA (1998)

== Education ==
- Queens College - B.A. Art History
- Columbia University - M.A. Art History

== Reviews ==
Rose’s work with Incite pictures has been called “unique and memorable,” “pure gold,” and “balanced and truthful,” by the Milwaukee Journal, Hollywood Reporter and The New York Times, respectively. The Washington Post wrote, “their fly-on-the-wall approach fulfills one of the glorious promises of documentary – to put us in the middle of situations we otherwise might never be in.”

== Book features ==
The Shut Up and Shoot Documentary Guide: A Down & Dirty DV Production By: Anthony Q. Artis “To anyone who wants to make a doc but doesn’t have a lot of time, money, or experience, Anthony Artis says: "It’s time to get down and dirty!"―a filmmaking mentality that teaches you how to be creative with your resources and do more with less. Written by a guerrilla filmmaker for guerrilla filmmakers, this all new edition of a bestselling classic doesn’t just tell you, it shows you how to make your projects better, faster, and cheaper.”

The Documentary Film Makers Handbook: A Gorilla Guide By: Genevieve Jolliffe & Andrew Zinnes “Documentary films have enjoyed a huge resurgence over the last few years, and there's a new generation of filmmakers wanting to get involved. In addition, the digital revolution has made documentaries even more accessible to the general filmmaker. Documentary films can now be shot professionally using cheaper equipment, and smaller cameras enable the documentarian to be less intrusive and therefore more intimate in the subjects' lives. The Documentary Film Makers Handbook will be an essential resource for anyone who wants to know more about breaking into this exciting field.”
