= Aryeh Neier =

American human rights activist (b. 1937)

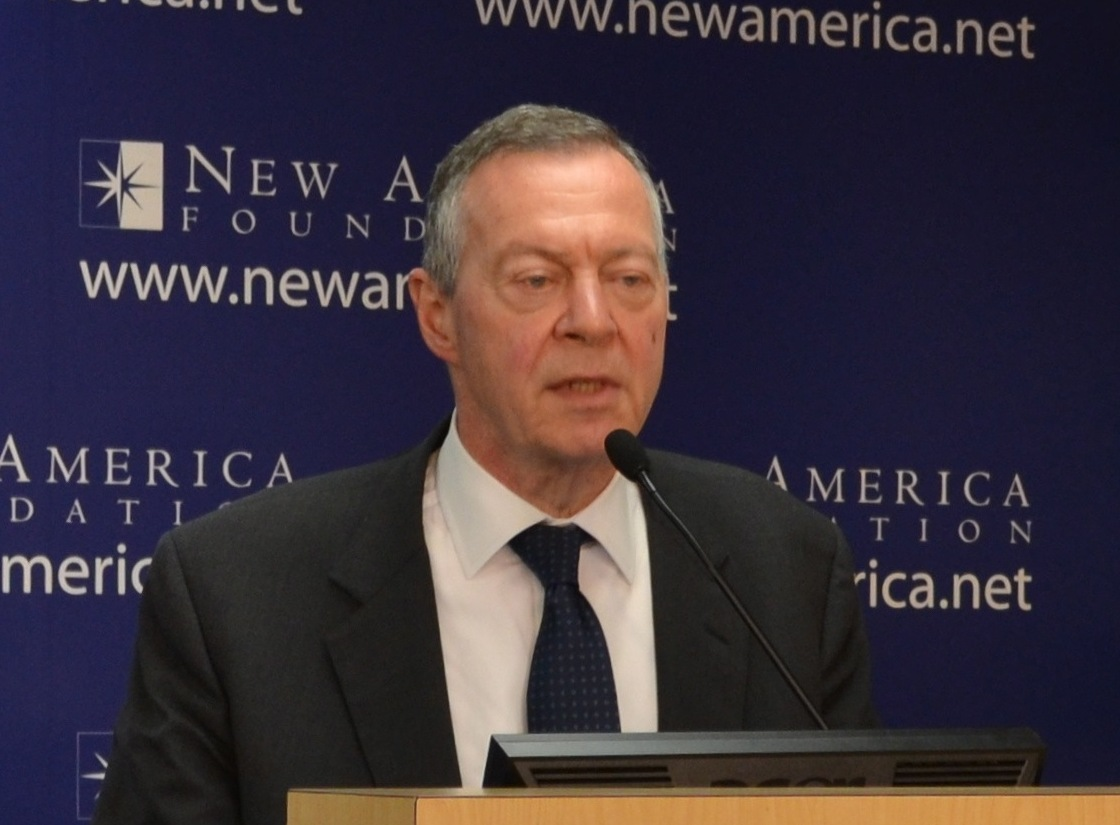
- Neier in 2013
- Born: April 22, 1937 (age 89); Berlin, Germany
- Education: Cornell University (BS)
- Spouse: Yvette Celton
- Children: 1

Aryeh Neier (born April 22, 1937) is an American human rights activist who co-founded Human Rights Watch, served as the inaugural president of George Soros's Open Society Institute philanthropy network from 1993 to 2012, directed the New York Civil Liberties Union from 1964 to 1970, and served as the national executive director of the American Civil Liberties Union from 1970 to 1978.

== Early life and education ==
Neier was born into a German Jewish family in Berlin, then in Nazi Germany. He was the son of Wolf (a teacher) and Gitla (Bendzinska) Neier. His family fled the country in 1939, when he was two years old. He graduated from Cornell University with highest honors in 1961.

== Career ==
He served as an adjunct professor of law at New York University.

Neier served as a director for the League for Industrial Democracy and was involved in the renaming of its student division to form the group Students for a Democratic Society in 1960.

Neier was hired by the ACLU in 1963 and became the organization's executive director in 1970; in this role, he helped grow the organization's membership from 140,000 to 200,000. He led the ACLU's efforts to protect the civil rights of prisoners and those in mental hospitals, fought for the abolition of the death penalty and to make abortions available to those who need them.

Neier was criticized for his decision to have the ACLU support the National Socialist Party of America, a Neo-Nazi group, in its efforts to march in Skokie, Illinois, in the case National Socialist Party of America v. Village of Skokie, despite the presence in Skokie of large numbers of Jews and Holocaust survivors. The ACLU's representation of the group resulted in 30,000 members who ended their ACLU membership. In his 1979 book, Defending My Enemy: American Nazis in Skokie, Illinois, and the Risks of Freedom, Neier defended his actions in support of the Skokie march, arguing that Jews are best protected by ensuring that the rule of law allowing minorities to speak out is afforded to all groups.

At a party in Washington, D.C. in early 1976, an attendee from New York indicated that he would not vote for Jimmy Carter for president because of his Southern accent, to which Charles Morgan, Jr., the ACLU's legislative director, replied "That's bigotry, and that makes you a bigot." Neier reprimanded Morgan, criticizing him for taking a public position on a candidate for public office. Morgan resigned from his post in April 1976, citing efforts by the bureaucracy at the ACLU to restrict his public statements.

In 1978 he was among the founders of Helsinki Watch, which was renamed Human Rights Watch in 1988. Neier has led investigations of human rights abuses around the world, participating in the creation of the International Criminal Tribunal for the former Yugoslavia. He has contributed articles and opinion pieces to newspapers, magazines and journals including The New York Review of Books, The New York Times Book Review and Foreign Policy.

He has taught a course called "Promoting Human Rights: History, Law, Methods and Current Controversies" at the Paris School of International Affairs, Sciences Po, in Paris.

In June 2024 Neier penned an article for The New York Review of Books in which he documented why he had come to the determination that Israel was committing the crime of genocide in Gaza.

Neier's 1979 book, Defending My Enemy: America Nazis in Skokie, Illinois, and the Risks of Freedom, is due to be republished in September 2025 with a new essay updating free speech developments over the last 50 years.

== Books ==
- Dossier: The Secret Files They Keep on You (1974)
- Crime and Punishment: A Radical Solution (1976)
- Defending My Enemy: American Nazis in Skokie, Illinois, and the Risks of Freedom (1979)
- Only Judgment: The Limits of Litigation in Social Change (1982)
- War Crimes: Brutality, Terror, and the Struggle for Justice (1998)
- Taking Liberties: Four Decades in the Struggle for Rights (2003)
- The International Human Rights Movement (2012)
