= Web filtering in schools =

Internet restrictions used by schools

Web filtering in schools blocks students from inappropriate and distracting content across the web, while allowing sites that are selected by school administrators. Rather than simply blocking off large portions of the Internet, many schools utilize customizable web filtering systems that provide them with greater control over which sites are allowed and which are blocked. Schools will typically block social media websites, games, pornography, other distracting websites, websites that harm academic integrity, websites that bypass web filtering, etc.

== By region ==
=== United States ===
The Children's Internet Protection Act (CIPA) requires that U.S. schools have appropriate measures in place to protect students from obscene or harmful online content in order to be eligible for discounts on internet access or internal connections through the Schools and Libraries Program of the Universal Service Fund, commonly known as the E-Rate program. There are a number of commercially available free and paid services to block harmful web content, allowing schools to meet CIPA requirements and therefore receiving the discount.

== Types ==
The FCC and CIPA do not specify how the filtering needs to be done, so most schools are using a combination of DNS, browser and firewall-based filtering.

=== DNS filtering ===
TDNS filtering happens at the domain resolution layer of the Internet and does not allow the IP address of an obscene or harmful website to be discovered. There are multiple paid products that perform such work, but many schools are leveraging free solutions to filter unsafe sites.

=== Browser-based filtering ===
School administrators can install browser extensions to all students that actively block inappropriate websites when the student is logged in. This method of web filtering is usually cloud-based, so the school can block websites even if the student is at home. There are many browser extensions, such as Securly, GoGuardian, and Lightspeed Systems that are able to filter web content.

=== Firewall-based filtering ===
Many schools also use firewall-based filtering to block inappropriate web content. This method of filtering happens by deeply analyzing website requests and traffic. The firewall blocks connections to certain websites if they are deemed inappropriate for students. It can check specific URLs, or it can block websites by category, where it checks a database of websites that fall in that specific category.

== See also ==
- Don't Filter Me
