= Gaggle =

Gaggle may refer to:

- Gaggle (band), an all-girl choir based in London
- Gaggle (software), student surveillance software
- Press gaggle
