= Student monitoring software =

Software to track student online activity

Student Monitoring Software is a type of educational technology product designed to track or manipulate student online activity in school or on school-issued devices.

These products enable school administrators and teachers to monitor and filter content that students engage with in real time. This includes search queries, messages, online document editing, and emails among other online activities.

Companies like Gaggle.net, Bark Technologies, GoGuardian, and Securly Inc. sell products that are used in school districts across the United States, however smaller companies which produce similar products do exist. Several of these products make use of artificial intelligence technology.

== History ==
While surveillance of student computer use by schools has existed before the creation of these products, the scale and speed at which monitoring and filtering capabilities can be achieved has grown vastly with the introduction of batch automation as offered by this type of software.

== Concerns ==
Advocates have expressed concern about the violation of student privacy and risk of over-surveillance of students of marginalized backgrounds and identities.

A 2023 report by the Surveillance Technology Oversight Project addresses the physcologial impact of online surveillance on students as well as the risk of disproportionate harm on low-income students and students of color who are reported as relying on school-issued devices more than personal devices.
