= Susan N. Herman =

American constitutional law scholar

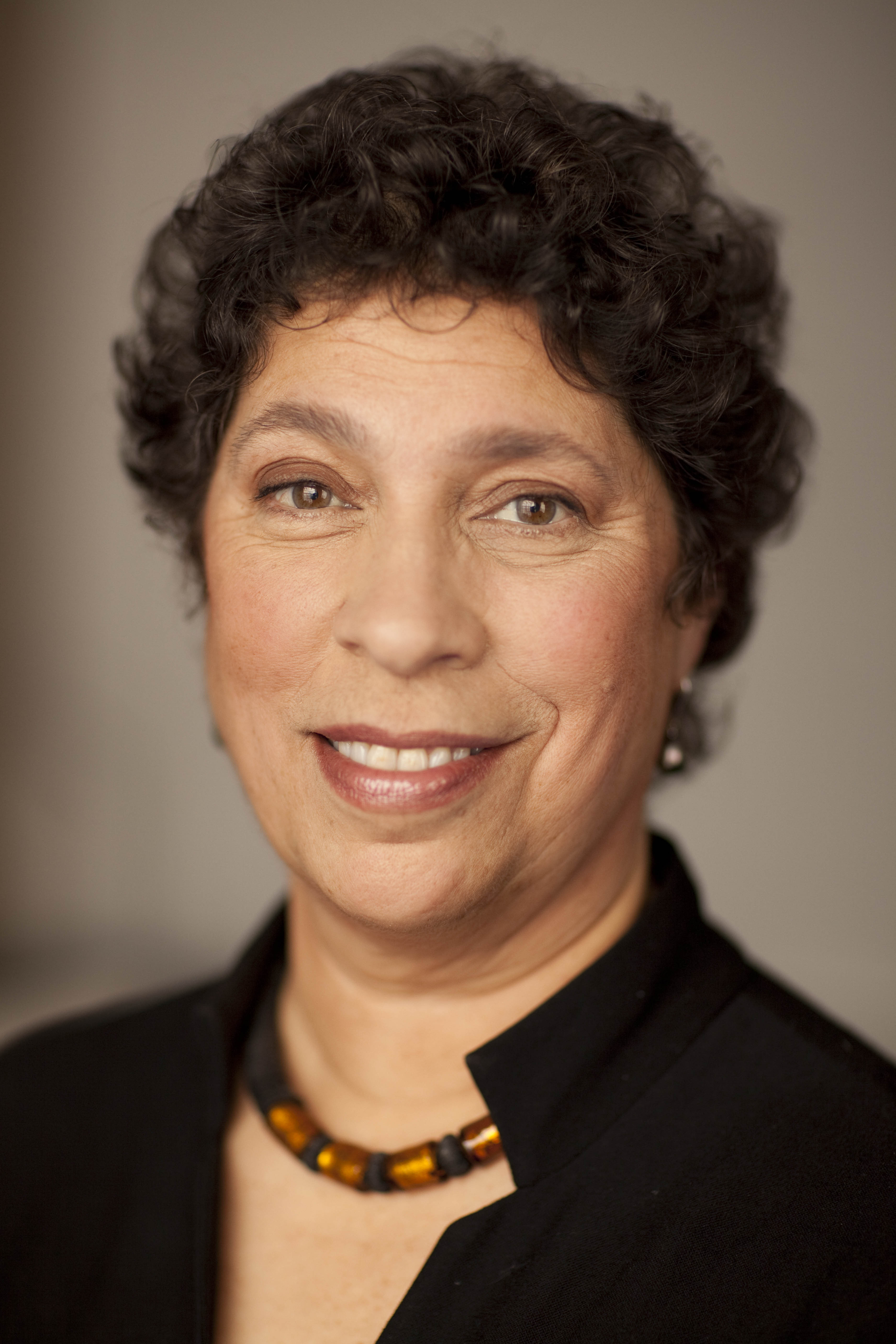

President of the American Civil Liberties Union
- In office October 2008 – January 31, 2021
- Preceded by: Nadine Strossen
- Succeeded by: Deborah Archer

Personal details
- Born: 1947 (age 78–79) Brooklyn, New York, U.S.
- Children: 1
- Education: Barnard College (BA); New York University (JD)

Susan N. Herman (born 1947) is an American legal scholar who served as president of the American Civil Liberties Union from October 2008 to January 2021. Herman has taught at Brooklyn Law School since 1980.

== Early life and education ==
Herman was born in Brooklyn and raised on Long Island. Herman earned a Bachelor of Arts degree in philosophy from Barnard College in 1968 and a Juris Doctor from the New York University School of Law, where she was a note and comment editor for the New York University Law Review.

Herman served as pro se law clerk for the United States Court of Appeals for the Second Circuit. She was a staff attorney and later associate director for Prisoners' Legal Services of New York.

== Career ==
Herman teaches constitutional law and criminal procedure, seminars on law and literature, and terrorism and civil liberties, at Brooklyn Law School where she is the inaugural Ruth Bader Ginsburg Professor of Law.

She began working for the ACLU as an intern in law school. When she was elected president, Herman was the organization's general counsel and had served on its board for 20 years.

Herman's book Taking Liberties: the War on Terror and the Erosion of American Democracy was published by Oxford University Press in October 2011, and won the 2012 Chicago-Kent College of Law/Roy C. Palmer Civil Liberties Prize.

Herman has appeared as a guest on NPR, PBS, C-SPAN, NBC News, and MSNBC. She has written opinion columns for The New York Times, Time, Newsday, and HuffPost.

In 2019, Herman was named to Crain's New York Business biennial list of the "Most Powerful Women in New York".

== Personal life ==
Herman is married to Paul Gangsei, a law partner at Manatt, Phelps & Phillips. They have one daughter.
