= Internet filtering =

Internet filtering may refer to:

- Internet filter, software that restricts or controls the content an Internet user is capable to access
  - Web filtering in schools

== See also ==
- Internet censorship
