= Pear Deck =

Education technology company

Pear Deck, Inc.
- Pear Deck logo
- Type: Private
- Industry: Education technology
- Founded: 2014; 12 years ago in Iowa City, IA, United States
- Headquarters: Los Angeles
- Products: Pear Deck
- Number of employees: 55 (2020)
- Parent: GoGuardian
- Website: peardeck.com

Pear Deck is an educational technology company based in Los Angeles, California. Pear Deck is also an interactive Presentation website, designed by teachers to provide more interest in teaching while engaging with students at the same time.

== History ==
Pear Deck was founded in 2014 in Iowa City, Iowa. In December 2014, Pear Deck raised $500,000 in seed funding. The company was awarded the "New Startup of the Year" award at the Silicon Prairie Awards.

In 2015, Pear Deck was selected as the winner of the "Rise of Rest" competition by Steve Case. It was also selected as a "Top Ten School Tool" by EdSurge, and was a winner of the Village Capital: EdTech 2015 program.

In 2016, Pear Deck expanded its sales team to Kansas City.

In November 2020, Pear Deck was acquired by GoGuardian.

In January 2024, Pear Deck would integrate Edulastic, alongside Giant Steps and TutorMe, into their franchise under GoGuardian, rebranding them as Pear Assessment, Pear Practice, and Pear Deck Tutor respectively.
