= Deborah Archer =

American lawyer and law professor

- Archer in 2026

President of the American Civil Liberties Union
- Incumbent
- Assumed office February 1, 2021
- Preceded by: Susan Herman

Personal details
- Spouse: Richard Buery
- Children: 2
- Education: Smith College (BA); Yale University (JD)

Deborah N. Archer is an American civil rights lawyer, legal scholar, and law professor who is the current president of the American Civil Liberties Union (ACLU). She is the first Black person to hold the position in the organization’s history.

Her career spans roles in civil rights advocacy, academia, and public service, including faculty appointments at New York Law School and New York University School of Law, leadership in the ACLU and the NAACP Legal Defense and Educational Fund, and scholarship focused on racial justice, voting rights, and transportation policy.

== Early life and education ==
Archer was born to Delroy and Paula Archer, both Jamaican migrants, in Windsor, Connecticut. Her father worked as a machinist at Colt Manufacturing, and her mother was a processing clerk at Fleet Bank. Archer is a first-generation American citizen and college graduate.

Archer graduated Smith College in 1993 with a degree in government, and earned her Juris Doctor from Yale Law School in 1996. At Yale, she won the Charles G. Albom Prize.

== Career ==
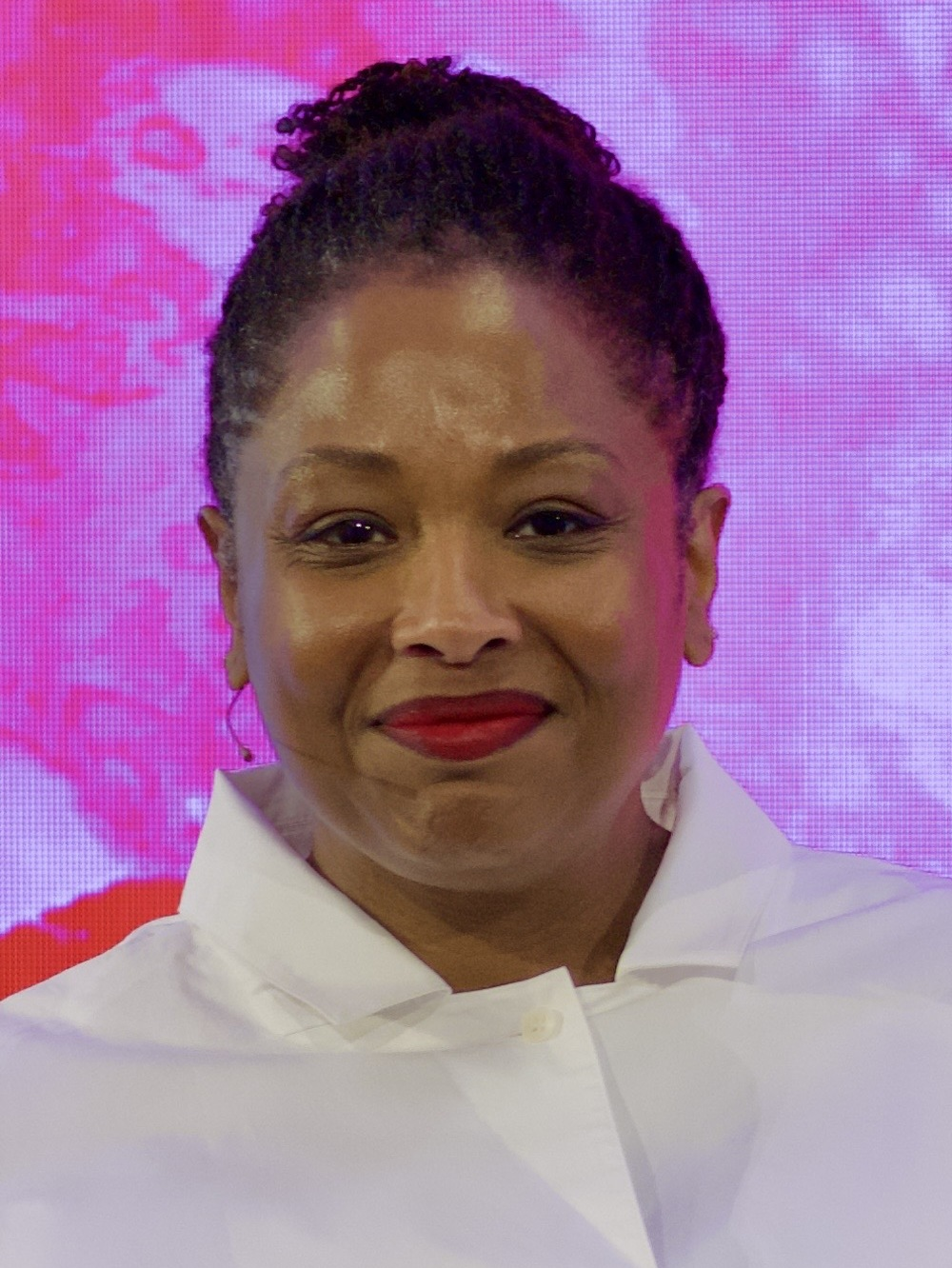
Archer at SXSW London, 2025

After graduating from Yale, Archer clerked for Judge Alvin W. Thompson of the U.S. District Court for the District of Connecticut. She then became the Marvin H. Karpatkin Legal Fellow at the American Civil Liberties Union in 1997. From 1998 to 2000, she was the assistant counsel at the NAACP Legal Defense and Educational Fund. She then worked as an associate at Simpson Thacher & Bartlett from 2000 to 2003.

Archer joined New York Law School (NYLS) as a member of the faculty in 2003 and was appointed professor of law in 2007. She directed the Racial Justice Project, co-directed the Impact Center for Public Interest Law Center, and was the inaugural dean of diversity and inclusion.

She became a member of the ACLU’s board of directors in 2009, joined the executive committee in 2016, and was general counsel in 2017. Archer was also the acting chairwoman of the New York City Civilian Complaint Review Board, first in April 2016 and again in August 2017. In 2018, Archer joined New York University School of Law as a tenured professor of clinical law, where she directs the Civil Rights Clinic and serves as co-faculty director of the Center on Race, Inequality, and the Law. Archer’s scholarship focuses on civil rights and racial justice, including voting rights, employment discrimination, and educational equity. She has published articles in various law reviews, including the Michigan Law Review and the Harvard Civil Rights–Civil Liberties Law Review. In 2019, she became a member of the board for the National Center for Law and Economic Justice.

Archer was elected president of the ACLU in January 2021, becoming the first Black person to hold the position in the organization’s 101-year history. As ACLU president, she oversees the board of directors and sets policy. She succeeded Susan N. Herman, who held the role for 12 years.

Archer was the Associate Dean for Clinical and Experiential Learning at NYU School of Law as of 2023. She has been a member of the boards for the New York Civil Liberties Union and The Legal Aid Society. She released her book Dividing Lines: How Transportation Infrastructure Reinforces Racial Inequality in 2025.

As of 2026, she is an elected member of the American Law Institute, as well as a Margaret B. Hoppin Professor of Clinical Law at NYU School of Law, the NYU faculty director of the Community Equity Initiative, the director of NYU Clinical & Advocacy programs, as well as the associate dean of Experiential Education & Clinical programs at NYU.

== Honors ==
Archer was named one of the Top Women in Law by the New York Law Journal in 2016. In 2021, the Law and Society Association awarded her an Honorable Mention for the John Hope Franklin Prize for her article "White Men's Roads Through Black Men's Homes': Advancing Racial Equity Through Highway Reconstruction", which appeared in the Vanderbilt Law Review. That same year, she received the Stephen Ellmann Memorial Clinical Scholarship Award from the American Association of Law Schools and the Haywood Burns/Shanara Guilbert Award from the Northeast People of Color Legal Scholarship Conference.

In 2022, Archer was awarded the Smith College Medal, the highest honor given to alumni by Smith College. In 2023, she received both the Outstanding Advocate for Clinical Teachers Award from the Clinical Legal Education Association and the Arabella Babb Mansfield Award from the National Association of Women Lawyers. In 2025, Archer was elected to the American Academy of Arts and Sciences. She holds an honorary degree from Seattle University.

== Personal life ==
Archer is married to Richard R. Buery, Jr., CEO of the nonprofit organization Robin Hood and a former deputy mayor of New York City. They live in Brooklyn with their two sons.

== Selected works ==
- Archer, Deborah N. Dividing Lines: How Transportation Infrastructure Reinforces Racial Inequality. W.W. Norton & Company (2025).
- Archer, Deborah N.; Schottenfeld, Joseph (2024). "Defending Home: Toward a Theory of Community Equity". University of Chicago Law Review, forthcoming.
- Archer, Deborah N. (2021). "Transportation Policy and the Underdevelopment of Black Communities". Iowa Law Review 106: 2125.
- Archer, Deborah N. (2020). “‘White Men’s Roads Through Black Men’s Homes’: Advancing Racial Equity Through Highway Reconstruction”. Vanderbilt Law Review. 73: 1259.
- Archer, Deborah N. (2019–20). “Exile From Main Street”. Harvard Civil Rights-Civil Liberties Law Review. 55: 788.
- Archer, Deborah N. (2019). The New Housing Segregation: The Jim Crow Effects of Crime-Free Housing Ordinances. Michigan Law Review. 118: 173.
- Archer, Deborah N. (2009–2010). "Introduction: Challenging the School-to-Prison Pipeline". New York Law School Law Review. 54: 867.
- Archer, Deborah N.; Williams, Kele S. (2005–2006). "Making America the Land of Second Chances: Restoring Socioeconomic Rights for Ex-Offenders". New York University Review of Law & Social Change. 30: 527.
- Archer, Deborah N. (2013). "There Is No Santa Claus: The Challenge of Teaching the Next Generation of Civil Rights Lawyers in a Post-Racial Society". Columbia Journal of Race and Law. 4: 55.
