= Don't Filter Me =

American LGBT rights project

Don't Filter Me is a project of the American Civil Liberties Union dedicated to fighting LGBT-related internet censorship that happens in public schools in the United States.

== History ==
State-funded schools in the United States use content-control software to restrict their students' access to pornographic websites, in accordance with the Children's Internet Protection Act of 2000. The products most commonly used to do this filtering treat websites that offer information about LGBT topics and organizations as pornography, even though these websites do not contain sexually explicit content. One such commonly filtered website is The Trevor Project, a website devoted to suicide prevention among at-risk LGBT youths. The White House publicly praised the Trevor Project in 2011.

Other sites that are commonly blocked include GLAAD, PFLAG (Parents, Families and Friends of Lesbians and Gays), the Gay, Lesbian and Straight Education Network (also honored by the White House), the Matthew Shepard Foundation, DignityUSA, Day of Silence, Campus Pride, and the Human Rights Campaign (the largest LGBT civil rights advocacy group and political lobbying organization in the United States).

A student attempting to access these sites is usually confronted by a page warning, "You have been denied access as it is characterized as LGBT. Your Internet usage is monitored and logged."

Some American conservatives are supportive of blocks on these and similar websites since they consider them to be promoting the so-called "homosexual agenda".

Filtering tools that prevent students from accessing websites related to positive LGBT organizations often permit access to sites that promote an anti-LGBT viewpoint, sites aimed at convincing LGBT people to change their sexual orientation, or sites that can be considered hate speech against LGBT people. Websites not generally blocked by this kind of filtering include the Family Research Council (an American conservative Christian group and lobbying organization) and the National Organization for Marriage (a political organization dedicated to working against the legalization of same-sex marriage in the United States), as well as Exodus International and People Can Change, both of which advocate conversion therapy to change a person's sexual orientation to heterosexual. Neither the American Psychiatric Association or the American Psychological Association consider conversion therapy a legitimate medical practice or homosexuality to be a mental disorder.

Companies that filter content for schools often include anti-LGBT content in their "religion" category.

Filtering software can also block content beyond the websites themselves. Students would, for example, be permitted to read Bowers v. Hardwick, the 1986 Supreme Court decision that upheld a Georgia law to criminalize sodomy, but prevented from reading Lawrence v. Texas, the 2003 Supreme Court ruling that asserted sodomy laws were unconstitutional. The ACLU contends that this filtering is discriminatory and violates the First Amendment rights of students in public schools.

In February 2011, the ACLU launched the Don't Filter Me project to combat this censorship and discrimination in viewpoint that was happening in state-funded schools.

== Response ==
Because of the Don't Filter Me project's efforts, some software providers who sell these filters implemented changes in their products. Companies such as Lightspeed Systems and Fortinet took action on their own and changed how their products categorize the websites in question. A number of school districts took steps to unblock LGBT-themed content that is not sexually explicit. The Rowland Unified School District and Oroville Union High School District were among the first to take action because of the work of the Don't Filter Me project.

Many other school districts followed suit and updated their filtering software to allow LGBT sites to be accessed from school computers. Conservative Christian groups like Alliance Defending Freedom urged school districts not to comply with the ACLU's requests.

In August 2011 the ACLU sued the Camdenton R-III School District of Camden County, Missouri, which had refused to change its filtering software, or the filtering behavior that that software created. This led a federal judge to issue a preliminary injunction to the district, ordering it to stop using software produced by the company URL Blacklist that blocks access to sites discussing LGBT issues. In her decision, Judge Nanette Kay Laughrey wrote "URL Blacklist systematically allows access to websites expressing a negative viewpoint toward LGBT individuals by categorizing them as 'religion', but filters out positive viewpoints toward LGBT issues by categorizing them as 'sexuality'." The school district later settled, and agreed to stop blocking the sites in question, to be monitored for 18 months, and to pay $125,000 in fines and court costs.
