= American Civil Liberties Union =

Legal advocacy organization in the United States

- Predecessor: National Civil Liberties Bureau
- Formation: January 19, 1920; 106 years ago
- Founders: Jeannette Rankin; Roger Nash Baldwin; Crystal Eastman; Helen Keller; Walter Nelles; Morris Ernst; Albert DeSilver; Arthur Garfield Hays; Jane Addams; Felix Frankfurter; Elizabeth Gurley Flynn
- Type: 501(c)(4) nonprofit organization
- Tax ID no.: 13-3871360
- Headquarters: 125 Broad Street, New York City, U.S.
- Region served: United States
- Members: 1.7 million (2024)
- President: Deborah Archer
- Executive Director: Anthony Romero
- Budget: $383 million (2024; combined ACLU and Foundation, excludes affiliates)
- Staff: 500 staff attorneys
- Volunteers: Several thousand attorneys
- Website: www.aclu.org

The American Civil Liberties Union (ACLU) is an American nonprofit civil rights organization founded in 1920. ACLU affiliates are active in all 50 states, Washington, D.C., and Puerto Rico. As of 2024, the ACLU's budget is $383 million.

The ACLU provides legal assistance in cases where it considers civil liberties at risk with advocacy from a secularist stance against excessive religious entanglement over the United States government. Legal support from the ACLU can take the form of direct legal representation or preparation of amicus curiae briefs expressing legal arguments when another law firm is already providing representation. In addition to representing persons and organizations in lawsuits, the ACLU lobbies for policy positions established by its board of directors.

The ACLU's current positions include opposing the death penalty; supporting same-sex marriage and the right of LGBTQ+ people to adopt; supporting reproductive rights such as birth control and abortion rights; eliminating discrimination against women, minorities, and LGBTQ+ people; decarceration in the United States; protecting housing and employment rights of veterans; reforming sex offender registries and protecting housing and employment rights of convicted first-time offenders; supporting the rights of prisoners and opposing torture; upholding the separation of church and state by opposing government preference for religion over nonbelief in religious doctrine or for particular faiths over others; and supporting the legality of gender-affirming treatments, including those that are government funded, for transgender youth.

== Leadership ==
The ACLU is led by a president and an executive director, Deborah Archer and Anthony D. Romero, respectively, as of September 2025. The president acts as chair of the ACLU's board of directors, leads fundraising, and facilitates policy-setting. The executive director manages the day-to-day operations of the organization. The board of directors consists of 80 persons, including representatives from each state affiliate and at-large delegates. The organization has its headquarters in 125 Broad Street, a 40-story skyscraper located in Lower Manhattan, New York City.

The leadership of the ACLU does not always agree on policy decisions; differences of opinion within the ACLU leadership have sometimes grown into major debates. In 1937, an internal debate erupted over whether to defend Henry Ford's right to distribute anti-union literature. In 1939, a heated debate took place over whether to prohibit communists from serving in ACLU leadership roles. During the early 1950s and Cold War McCarthyism, the board was divided on whether to defend communists. In 1968, a schism formed over whether to represent Benjamin Spock's anti-war activism. In 1973, as the Watergate Scandal continued to unfold, leadership was initially divided over whether to call for President Richard Nixon's impeachment and removal from office. In 2005, there was internal conflict about whether or not a gag rule should be imposed on ACLU employees to prevent the publication of internal disputes.

== Funding ==
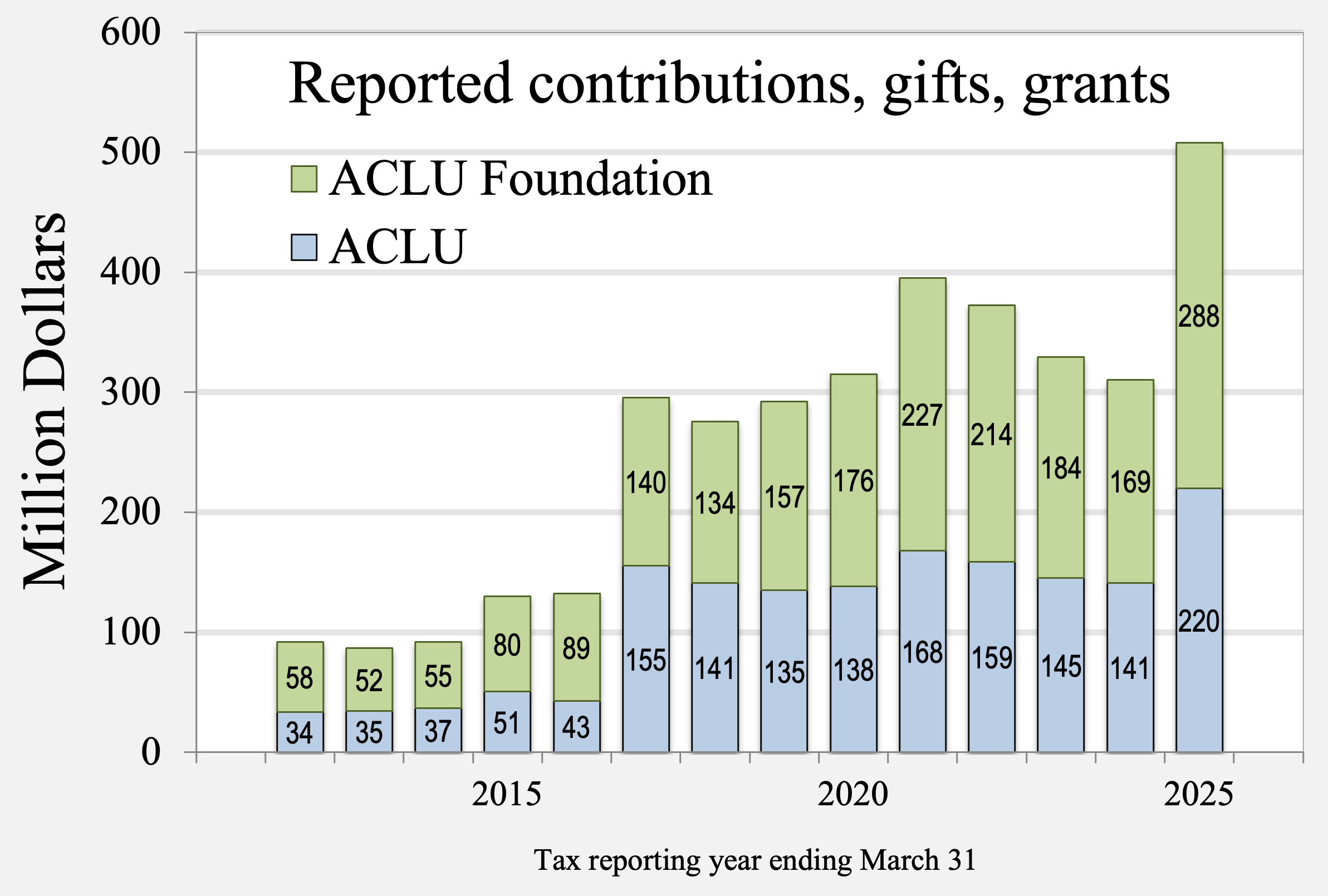
Amounts reported to IRS as "Contributions, Gifts, Grants and Other Similar Amounts" by ACLU and ACLU Foundation. Graph reflects an increase in donations following U.S. President Trump's January 2017 executive order barring millions of refugees and citizens of seven Muslim-majority countries.

The ACLU solicits donations to its charitable foundation. The local affiliates solicit their own funding; however, some also receive funds from the national ACLU, with the distribution and amount of such assistance varying from state to state. At its discretion, the national organization provides subsidies to smaller affiliates that lack sufficient resources to be self-sustaining; for example, the Wyoming ACLU chapter received such subsidies until April 2015, when, as part of a round of layoffs at the national ACLU, the Wyoming office was closed.

In October 2004, the ACLU rejected $1.5 million from both the Ford Foundation and Rockefeller Foundation because the foundations had adopted language from the USA PATRIOT Act in their donation agreements, including a clause stipulating that none of the money would go to "underwriting terrorism or other unacceptable activities". The ACLU views this clause, both in federal law and in the donors' agreements, as a threat to civil liberties, saying it is overly broad and ambiguous.

Due to the nature of its legal work, the ACLU is often involved in litigation against governmental bodies, which are generally protected from adverse monetary judgments; a town, state, or federal agency may be required to change its laws or behave differently, but not to pay monetary damages except by an explicit statutory waiver. In some cases, the law permits plaintiffs who successfully sue government agencies to collect money damages or other monetary relief. In particular, the Civil Rights Attorney's Fees Award Act of 1976 leaves the government liable in some civil rights cases. Fee awards under this civil rights statute are considered "equitable relief" rather than damages, and government entities are not immune from equitable relief. Under laws such as this, the ACLU and its state affiliates sometimes share in monetary judgments against government agencies. In 2006, the Public Expressions of Religion Protection Act sought to prevent monetary judgments in the particular case of violations of church-state separation.

The ACLU has received court-awarded fees from opponents; for example, the Georgia affiliate was awarded $150,000 in fees after suing a county demanding the removal of a Ten Commandments display from its courthouse; a second Ten Commandments case in the state, in a different county, led to a $74,462 judgment. The State of Tennessee was required to pay $50,000, the State of Alabama $175,000, and the State of Kentucky $121,500, in similar Ten Commandments cases.

In 2024, the ACLU received $268M in grants and donations from supporters.

== Policy positions ==
The ACLU's 2024 annual report states that it engages in legal advocacy in support of civil rights, including abortion rights, LGBTQ equality, immigrants' rights, criminal law reform, free speech, and voting rights.

When the ACLU was formed in 1919, free speech was the civil right that it concentrated on. The ACLU has supported free speech, even when the speech is unpopular or offensive. The ACLU opposes limits on campaign contributions that would infringe on free speech, but supports public campaign financing and reasonable limits. The ACLU also opposes state censorship of the Confederate flag. Free speech on college campuses has been the subject of several lawsuits the ACLU has supported. In the employment realm, the ACLU has supported the rights of employees to engage in free speech. Protests outside religious buildings are supported by the ACLU, even when perceived as offensive.

Combating discrimination based on race, religion, ethnicity, or gender has been a focus of the ACLU since the civil rights era in the 1960s. The ACLU frequently participates in legal actions in support of the LGBTQ community.

Criminal justice has been long-standing goal of the ACLU, focusing on constitutional issues such as excessive punishment and the right to an attorney. Immigrant rights, for undocumented immigrants in particular, is an area of the law that the ACLU frequently acts as an advocate.

Many of the ACLU positions are rooted in the U.S. Constitution, such as the Second Amendment: the ACLU opposes any effort to create a national registry of gun owners and has worked with the National Rifle Association of America to prevent a registry from being created, and it has favored protecting the right to carry guns under the Second Amendment. However, the ACLU also supports some degree of gun control.

The ACLU supports the decriminalization of sex work. The group also supports legal abortions.

== Support and opposition ==
The ACLU has received criticism for its defense of individuals and organizations with offensive or unpopular viewpoints. The most ardent criticisms have come in response to its defense of the Ku Klux Klan, neo-Nazis, the Nation of Islam, the North American Man/Boy Love Association, the Westboro Baptist Church or the Unite the Right rally. The ACLU's official policy is "... [we have] represented or defended individuals engaged in some truly offensive speech. We have defended the speech rights of communists, Nazis, Ku Klux Klan members, accused terrorists, pornographers, anti-LGBTQ activists, and flag burners. That's because the defense of freedom of speech is most necessary when the message is one most people find repulsive. Constitutional rights must apply to even the most unpopular groups if they're going to be preserved for everyone."

The organization has found legal and financial support from individuals and organizations of disparate political affiliations. Allies of the ACLU in legal actions have included the National Association for the Advancement of Colored People, the American Jewish Congress, the National Rifle Association of America, Planned Parenthood, the Electronic Frontier Foundation, and Americans United for Separation of Church and State. In her 2009 book, former board member Wendy Kaminer criticized the ACLU's expanded fundraising and accused its leadership of catering to its donors.

A nonpartisan stance is avowed by the ACLU, and the ACLU has supported conservative figures such as Rush Limbaugh, George Wallace, Henry Ford and Oliver North; as well as liberal figures such as Dick Gregory, Rockwell Kent, and Benjamin Spock. However, the ACLU has been accused of partisanship by both liberals and conservatives. Liberals have criticized the ACLU for excluding communists from its leadership ranks; defending neo-Nazis; declining to defend Paul Robeson; and opposing the passage of the National Labor Relations Act. In 2014, an ACLU affiliate supported anti-Islam protesters, and in 2018 the ACLU was criticized when it supported the NRA. Conversely, it has been criticized by conservatives, such as when it argued against official prayer in public schools or when it opposed the Patriot Act.

== Organization and state affiliates ==
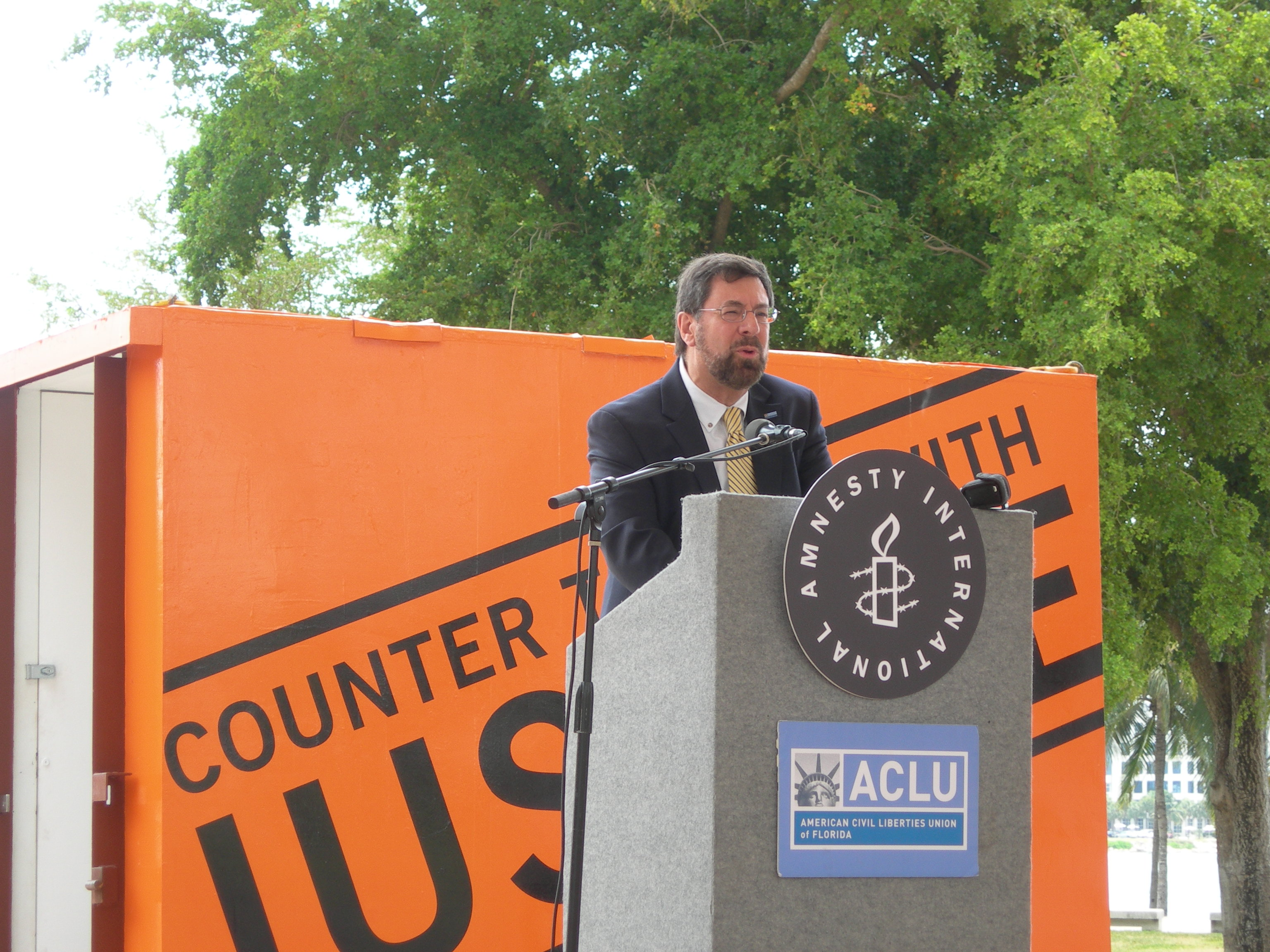
Howard Simon, executive director of the ACLU of Florida, joins in a protest of the Guantanamo Bay detentions with Amnesty International.

At the national level, the ACLU consists of two legal entities: the American Civil Liberties Union, a 501(c)(4) social welfare group; and the ACLU Foundation, a 501(c)(3) public charity. Both are non-profit organizations that engage in civil rights litigation, advocacy, and education. The two organizations are closely related, and share common goals and some common leadership. Donations to the 501(c)(3) foundation are tax-deductible, but donations to the 501(c)(4) are not. The 501(c)(4) group can engage in unlimited political advocacy (including lobbying), but the 501(c)(3) foundation cannot.

Most of the organization's workload is performed by its local affiliates. There is at least one affiliate organization in each state, as well as one in Washington, D.C., and in Puerto Rico. California has three affiliates. The affiliates operate autonomously from the national organization; each affiliate has its own staff, executive director, board of directors, and budget. Each affiliate consists of two non-profit corporations: a 501(c)(3) corporation–called the ACLU Foundation–that does not perform lobbying, and a 501(c)(4) corporation–called ACLU–which is entitled to lobby. Both organizations share staff and offices.

ACLU affiliates are the basic unit of the ACLU's organization and engage in litigation, lobbying, and public education. For example, in 2020, the ACLU's New Jersey chapter argued 26 cases before the New Jersey Supreme Court, about one-third of the total cases heard in that court. They sent over 50,000 emails to officials or agencies and had 28 full-time staff.

=== American Civil Liberties Union state affiliates ===
State	ACLU state affiliate
Alabama	ACLU of Alabama
Alaska	ACLU of Alaska
Arizona	ACLU of Arizona
Arkansas	ACLU of Arkansas
California	ACLU of Northern California; ACLU of Southern California; ACLU of San Diego & Imperial Counties
Colorado	ACLU of Colorado
Connecticut	ACLU of Connecticut
Delaware	ACLU of Delaware
District of Columbia	ACLU of the District of Columbia
Florida	ACLU of Florida
Georgia	ACLU of Georgia
Hawaii	ACLU of Hawai'i
Idaho	ACLU of Idaho
Illinois	ACLU of Illinois
Indiana	ACLU of Indiana
Iowa	ACLU of Iowa
Kansas	ACLU of Kansas
Kentucky	ACLU of Kentucky
Louisiana	ACLU of Louisiana
Maine	ACLU of Maine
Maryland	ACLU of Maryland
Massachusetts	ACLU of Massachusetts
Michigan	ACLU of Michigan
Minnesota	ACLU of Minnesota
Mississippi	ACLU of Mississippi
Missouri	ACLU of Missouri
Montana	ACLU of Montana
Nebraska	ACLU of Nebraska
Nevada	ACLU of Nevada
New Hampshire	ACLU of New Hampshire
New Jersey	American Civil Liberties Union of New Jersey
New Mexico	ACLU of New Mexico
New York	New York Civil Liberties Union
North Carolina	ACLU of North Carolina
North Dakota	ACLU of North Dakota
Ohio	ACLU of Ohio
Oklahoma	ACLU of Oklahoma
Oregon	ACLU of Oregon
Pennsylvania	ACLU of Pennsylvania
Puerto Rico	ACLU of Puerto Rico National Chapter
Rhode Island	ACLU of Rhode Island
South Carolina	ACLU of South Carolina
South Dakota	ACLU of South Dakota
Tennessee	ACLU of Tennessee
Texas	ACLU of Texas
Utah	ACLU of Utah
Vermont	ACLU of Vermont
Virginia	ACLU of Virginia
Washington	ACLU of Washington
West Virginia	ACLU of West Virginia
Wisconsin	ACLU of Wisconsin
Wyoming	ACLU of Wyoming

== History ==
The ACLU has undertaken a large number of legal initiatives during its existence. In the chronological history below, ACLU initiatives are described in the decade in which the ACLU started advocating for the legal initiative. The description may include events that extended beyond the starting decade.

=== 1910s and '20s ===
==== Origins ====
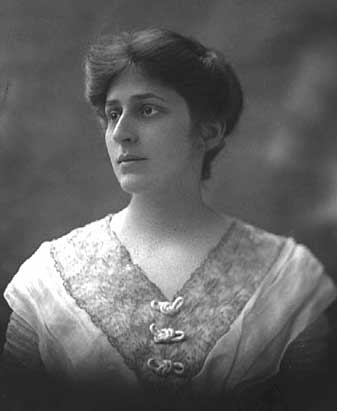
Crystal Eastman was one of the co-founders of the CLB, the predecessor to the ACLU.

The ACLU developed from the National Civil Liberties Bureau (CLB), co-founded in 1917 during World War I by Crystal Eastman, an attorney activist, and Roger Nash Baldwin. The focus of the CLB was on freedom of speech, primarily anti-war speech, and on supporting conscientious objectors who did not want to serve in World War I. In 1918, Crystal Eastman resigned from the organization due to health issues. (Note: After assuming sole leadership of the CLB, Baldwin insisted that the organization be reorganized. He wanted to change its focus from litigation to direct action and public education.)

On January 19, 1920, the CLB directors formed an organization under a new name, the American Civil Liberties Union. Although a handful of other organizations in the United States at that time focused on civil rights, such as the National Association for the Advancement of Colored People (NAACP) and Anti-Defamation League (ADL), the ACLU was the first that did not represent a particular group of persons or a single theme. During the first decades of the ACLU, Baldwin continued as its leader. His charisma and energy attracted many supporters to the ACLU board and leadership ranks. The ACLU was directed by an executive committee and was not particularly democratic or egalitarian. New Yorkers dominated the ACLU's headquarters. Most ACLU funding came from philanthropies, such as the Garland Fund.

==== Free speech era ====
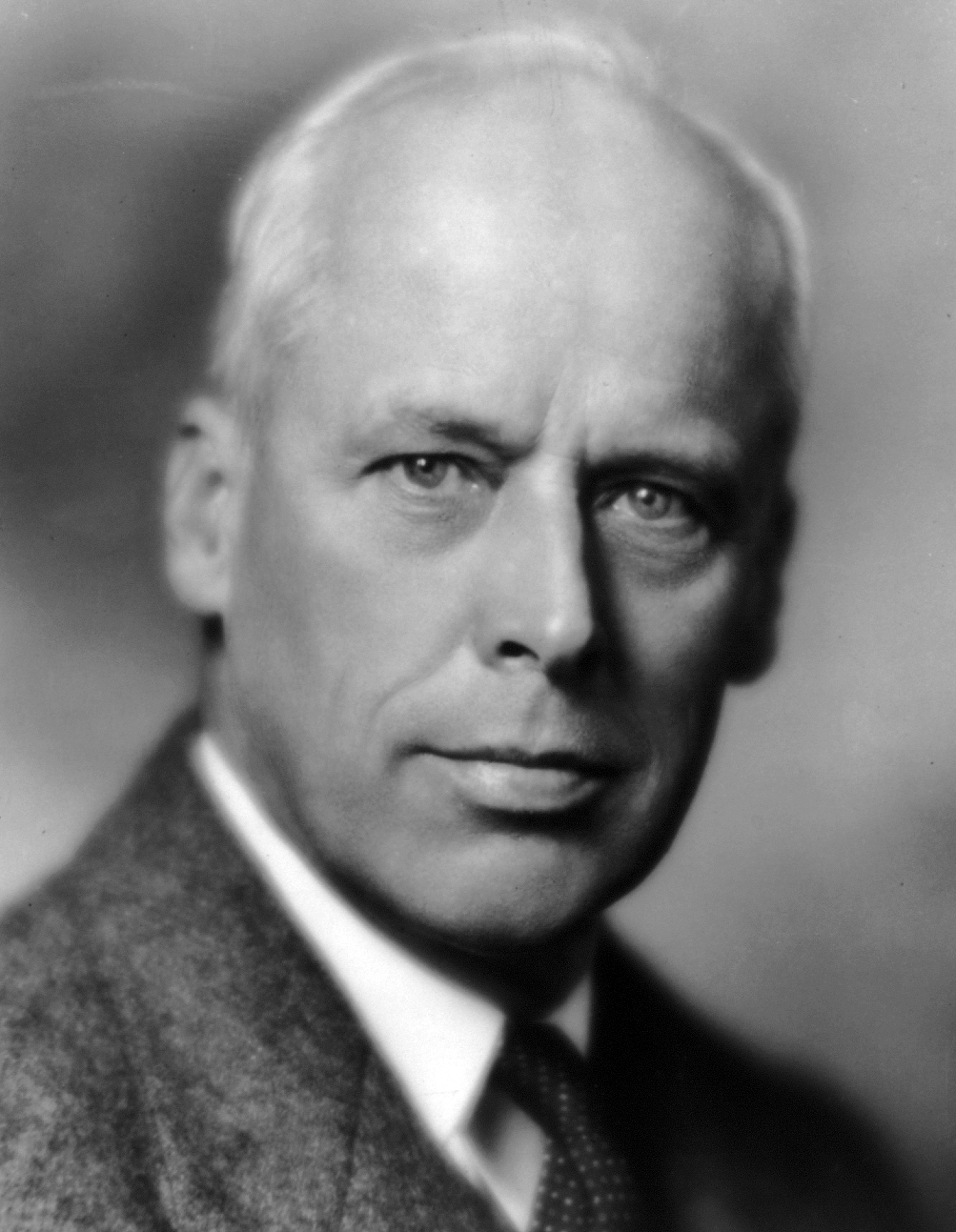
Norman Thomas was one of the early leaders of the ACLU.

During the 1920s, the ACLU's primary focus was on freedom of speech in general and speech within the labor movement particularly. Because most of the ACLU's efforts were associated with the labor movement, the ACLU itself came under heavy attack from conservative groups, such as the American Legion, the National Civic Federation, and Industrial Defense Association and the Allied Patriotic Societies. In addition to labor, the ACLU also led efforts in non-labor arenas, for example, promoting free speech in public schools. The ACLU, working with the NAACP, also supported racial discrimination cases.

Government officials routinely hounded the Communist Party USA, leading it to be the primary client of the ACLU. At the same time, the Communists were very aggressive in their tactics, often engaging in illegal conduct such as denying their party membership under oath. This led to frequent conflicts between the Communists and ACLU.

==== Public schools ====
Five years after the ACLU was formed, the organization had virtually no success to show for its efforts. That changed in 1925, when the ACLU persuaded John T. Scopes to defy Tennessee's anti-evolution law in The State of Tennessee v. John Thomas Scopes. Clarence Darrow, a member of the ACLU National Committee, headed Scopes' legal team. The Scopes trial was a phenomenal public relations success for the ACLU. The ACLU became well known across America, and the case led to the first endorsement of the ACLU by a major US newspaper.

The most important ACLU case of the 1920s was Gitlow v. New York, in which Benjamin Gitlow was arrested for violating a state law against inciting anarchy and violence when he distributed literature promoting communism. Although the Supreme Court did not overturn Gitlow's conviction, it adopted the ACLU's stance (later termed the incorporation doctrine) that the First Amendment freedom of speech applied to state laws, as well as federal laws.

==== Free speech expansion ====
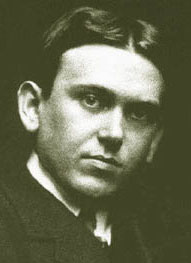
The ACLU defended H. L. Mencken when he was arrested for distributing banned literature.

Leaders of the ACLU were divided on the best tactics to use to promote civil liberties. Felix Frankfurter felt that legislation was the best long-term solution because the Supreme Court could not mandate liberal interpretations of the Bill of Rights. But Walter Pollak, Morris Ernst, and other leaders felt that Supreme Court decisions were the best path to guarantee civil liberties.

The Comstock laws banned the distribution of sex education information based on the premise that it was obscene and led to promiscuous behavior. Birth control activist Mary Ware Dennett was fined in 1928 for distributing a pamphlet containing sex education material. The ACLU appealed her conviction and won a reversal.

=== 1930s ===
Although the ACLU deferred to the NAACP for litigation promoting civil liberties for African Americans, the ACLU engaged in educational efforts and published Black Justice in 1931, a report which documented institutional racism throughout the South, including lack of voting rights, segregation, and discrimination in the justice system.

The ACLU participated in the 1937 De Jonge v. Oregon case, and won a major victory when the Supreme Court ruled that "peaceable assembly for lawful discussion cannot be made a crime." The De Jonge case marked the start of an era lasting for a dozen years, during which Roosevelt appointees (led by Hugo Black, William O. Douglas, and Frank Murphy) established a body of civil liberties law. In 1938, Justice Harlan F. Stone wrote the famous "footnote four" in United States v. Carolene Products Co. in which he suggested that state laws which impede civil liberties would – henceforth – require compelling justification.

The ACLU regularly tackled police misconduct issues, starting with the 1932 case Powell v. Alabama (right to an attorney), and including 1942's Betts v. Brady (right to an attorney), and 1951's Rochin v. California (involuntary stomach pumping). In the late 1940s, several ACLU local affiliates established permanent committees to address policing issues.

==== Communism and totalitarianism ====
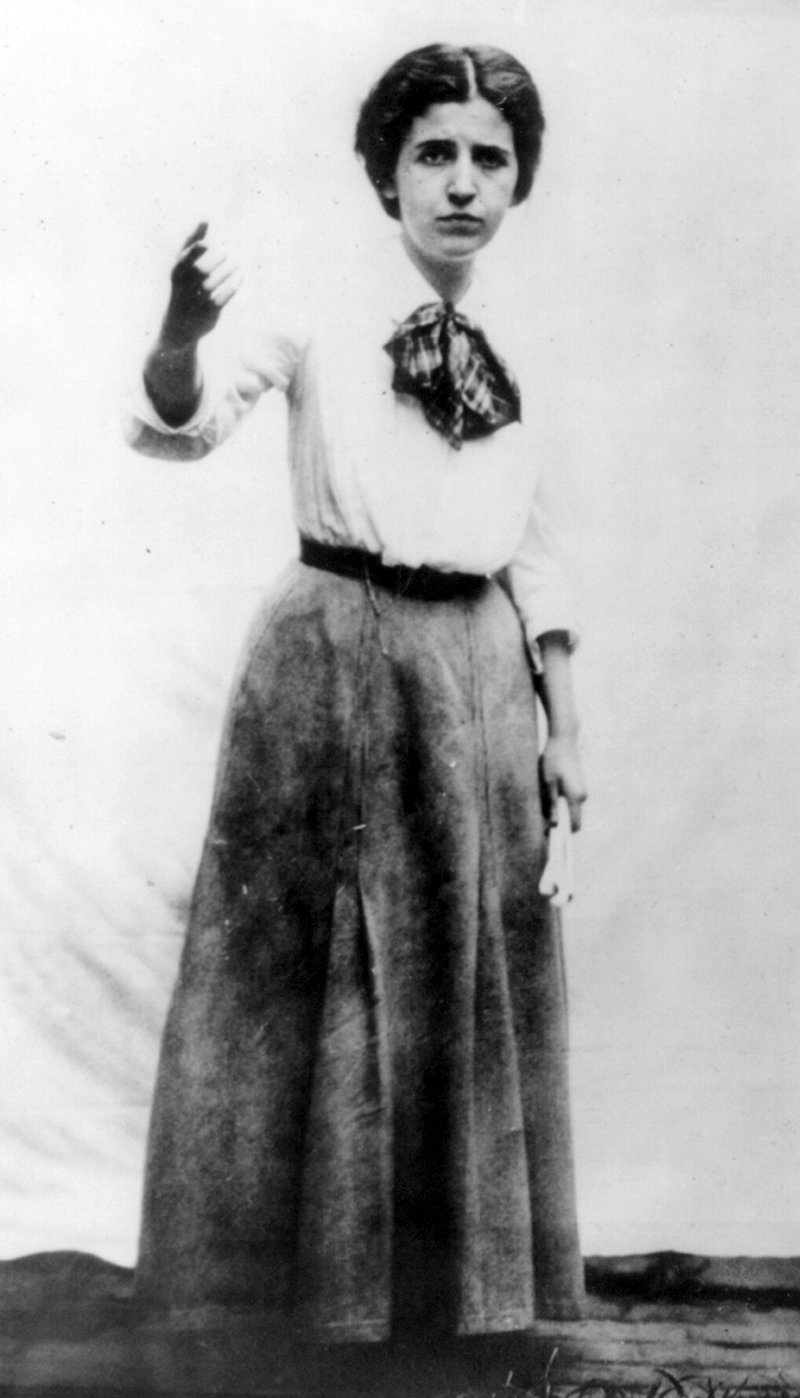
Elizabeth Gurley Flynn was voted off the ACLU board in 1940 because of her Communist Party membership but reinstated posthumously in 1970.

The ACLU leadership was divided over whether or not to defend pro-Nazi speech in the United States; pro-labor elements within the ACLU were hostile towards Nazism and fascism and objected when the ACLU defended Nazis. The ACLU defended numerous pro-Nazi groups, defending their rights to free speech and free association.

The House Un-American Activities Committee (HUAC) was created in 1938 to uncover sedition and treason within the United States. When witnesses testified at its hearings, the ACLU was mentioned several times, leading the HUAC to mention the ACLU prominently in its 1939 report. This damaged the ACLU's reputation severely, even though the report said that it could not "definitely state whether or not" the ACLU was a communist organization.

ACLU leadership was split on whether to purge its leadership of communists. Norman Thomas, John Haynes Holmes, and Morris Ernst were anti-communists who wanted to distance the ACLU from communism; opposing them were Harry F. Ward, Corliss Lamont, and Elizabeth Gurley Flynn, who rejected any political test for ACLU leadership. A bitter struggle ensued throughout 1939, and the anti-communists prevailed in February 1940 when the board voted to prohibit anyone who supported totalitarianism from ACLU leadership roles. Ward immediately resigned, and – following a contentious six-hour debate – Flynn was voted off the ACLU's board. The 1940 resolution was considered by many to be a betrayal of its fundamental principles. The resolution was rescinded in 1968, and Flynn was posthumously reinstated to the ACLU in 1970.

=== 1940s ===
==== Separation of church and state ====
Legal battles concerning the separation of church and state originated in laws dating to 1938, which required religious instruction in school or provided state funding for religious schools. The ACLU led the challenge in the 1947 Everson v. Board of Education case, in which Justice Hugo Black wrote "[t]he First Amendment has erected a wall between church and state.... That wall must be kept high and impregnable." It was not clear that the Bill of Rights forbid state governments from supporting religious education, and strong legal arguments were made by religious proponents, arguing that the Supreme Court should not act as a "national school board", and that the Constitution did not govern social issues. However, the ACLU and other advocates of church/state separation persuaded the Court to declare such activities unconstitutional.

In 1948, the ACLU prevailed in the McCollum v. Board of Education case, which challenged public school religious classes taught by clergy paid for by private funds. The ACLU also won cases challenging schools in New Mexico that were taught by clergy and had crucifixes hanging in the classrooms.

==== World War II ====
Roosevelt put constant pressure on Attorney General Francis Biddle to take legal action against his prominent WW II critics. Partly to appease the president, Biddle finally charged thirty lesser-known individuals for violating the Smith Act. Although many of the defendants did not know each other, and most lived in scattered locations in the U.S., they were all tried at once in Washington, D.C., in the Sedition Trial of 1944. Despite efforts by Roger N. Baldwin, Norman Thomas, Thurgood Marshall, and others in the leadership to get the ACLU to go on record condemning the trial (Baldwin called it "monstrous"), the board of directors overruled them.

The ACLU also had a mixed record on fighting wartime restrictions on the press. It was silent when the U.S. Post Office revoked the second class mailing privileges of Social Justice, the magazine of Father Charles E. Coughlin. On the other hand, it extended legal aid to the publishers of the Militant of the Socialist Workers Party and the Boise Valley Herald when their mailing rights were revoked. The ACLU was unable to prevent extensive extralegal harassment of the Black press by the FBI and other agencies. The ACLU's shortcomings in defending civil liberties inspired the contemporary saying "born in World War I and died in World War II."

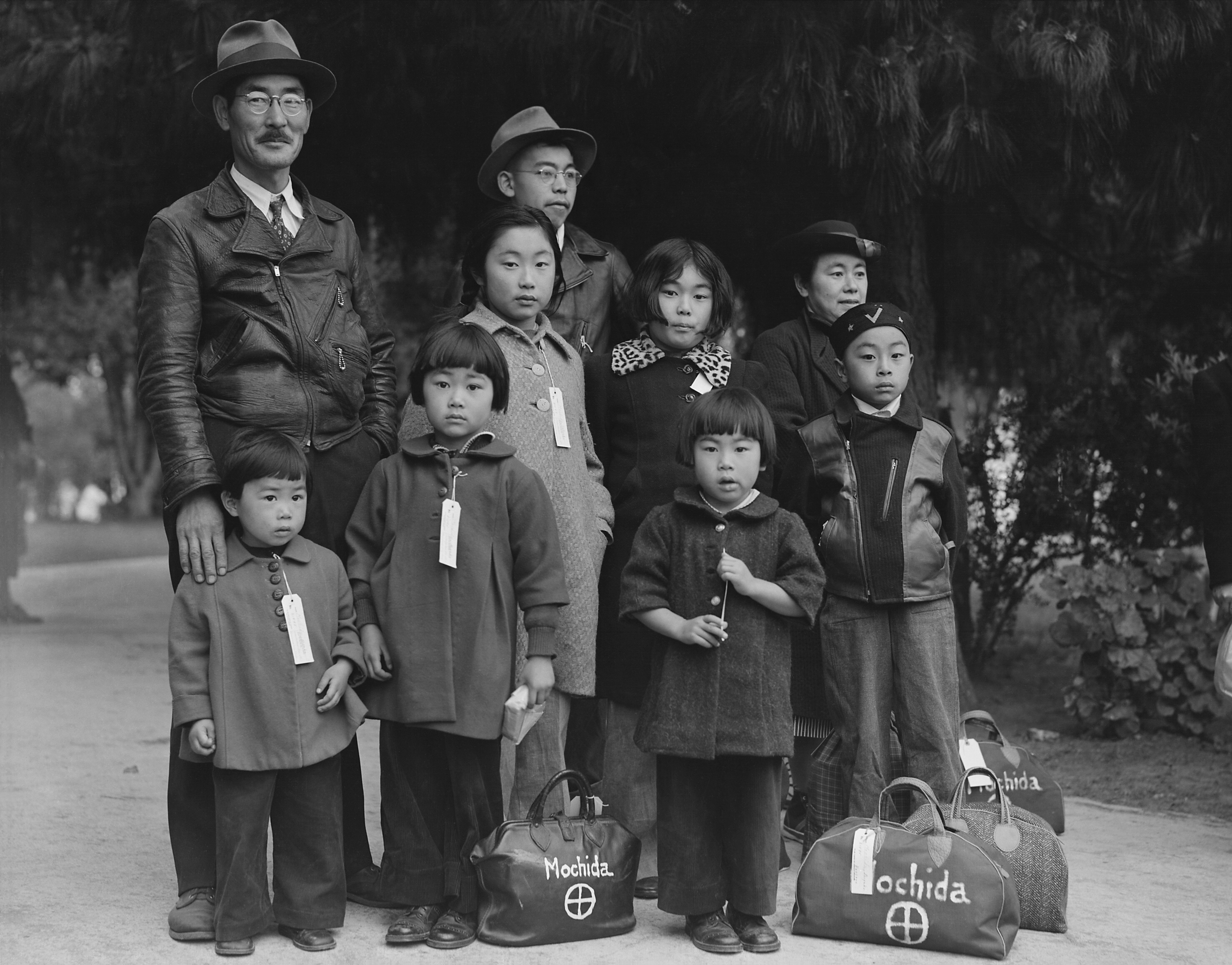
The ACLU was internally divided when it came to defending the rights of Japanese Americans who had been forcibly relocated to internment camps.

Two months after the Japanese attack on Pearl Harbor, Roosevelt authorized the creation of military "exclusion zones" with Executive Order 9066, paving the way for the detention of all West Coast Japanese Americans in inland camps. In addition to the non-citizen Issei (prohibited from naturalization as members of an "unassimilable" race), over two-thirds of those swept up were American-born citizens. The West Coast offices had wanted a test case to take to court. However, they had a difficult time finding a Japanese American who was both willing to violate the internment orders and able to meet the ACLU's desired criteria of a sympathetic, Americanized plaintiff. Of the 120,000 Japanese Americans affected by the order, only 12 disobeyed, and Korematsu, Hirabayashi, and two others were the only resisters whose cases eventually made it to the Supreme Court. Hirabayashi v. United States came before the Court in May 1943, and the justices upheld the government's right to exclude Japanese Americans from the West Coast. (Note: Korematsu v. United States proved to be the most controversial of these cases, as Besig and Collins refused to bow to the national ACLU office's pressure to pursue the case without challenging the government's right to remove citizens from their homes. The ACLU board threatened to revoke the San Francisco branch's national affiliation. At the same time, Baldwin tried unsuccessfully to convince Collins to step down so he could replace him as lead attorney in the case. Legal scholar Peter Irons later asserted that the national office of the ACLU's decision not to challenge the constitutionality of Executive Order 9066 directly had "crippled the effective presentation of these appeals to the Supreme Court".)

The national office of the ACLU was even more reluctant to defend anti-war protesters. A majority of the board passed a resolution in 1942 that declared the ACLU unwilling to defend anyone who interfered with the United States' war effort. The national organization prohibited local branches from representing the renunciants, forcing Collins to pursue the case independently, although Besig and the Northern California office provided some support.

==== Cold War era ====
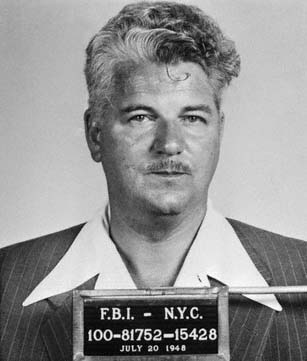
The ACLU chose not to support Eugene Dennis or other leaders of the US Communist Party, and they were all imprisoned, along with their attorneys.

Anti-Communist sentiment gripped the United States during the Cold War beginning in 1946. Federal investigations caused many persons with Communist or left-leaning affiliations to lose jobs, become blocklisted, or be jailed. The ACLU was internally divided when it purged Communists from its leadership in 1940, and that ambivalence continued as it decided whether to defend alleged Communists during the late 1940s. This ambivalent state of affairs would last until 1954, when the civil liberties faction prevailed, leading to most anti-Communist leaders' resignations. In 1947, President Truman issued Executive Order 9835, which created the Federal Loyalty Program. This program authorized the Attorney General to create a list of organizations that were deemed to be subversive. Although ACLU leadership was divided on whether to challenge the Federal Loyalty Program, some challenges were successfully made.

Also in 1947, the House Un-American Activities Committee (HUAC) subpoenaed ten Hollywood directors and writers, the Hollywood Ten, intending to ask them to identify Communists, but the witnesses refused to testify. All were imprisoned for contempt of Congress. The ACLU supported several artists' appeals but lost on appeal. The ACLU was more successful with an education effort; the 1952 report The Judges and the Judged, prepared at the ACLU's direction in response to the blocklisting of actress Jean Muir, described the unfair and unethical actions behind the blocklisting process, and it helped gradually turn public opinion against McCarthyism.

The federal government took direct aim at the US Communist Party in 1948 when it indicted its top twelve leaders in the Foley Square trial. The case hinged on whether or not mere membership in a totalitarian political party was sufficient to conclude that members advocated the overthrow of the United States government. The ACLU chose not to represent any of the defendants, and they were all found guilty. In a change of heart, the ACLU supported the party leaders during their appeal process. The Supreme Court upheld the convictions in the Dennis v. United States decision by softening the free speech requirements from a "clear and present danger" test to a "grave and probable" test. (Note: The Dennis decision paved the way for the prosecution of hundreds of other Communist party members. The ACLU supported many Communists during their appeals (although most of the initiative originated with local ACLU affiliates, not the national headquarters), but most convictions were upheld. The two California affiliates, in particular, felt the national ACLU headquarters was not supporting civil liberties strongly enough, and they initiated more cold war cases than the national headquarters did.) The ACLU challenged many loyalty oath requirements across the country, but the courts upheld most loyalty oath laws. The Supreme Court, until 1957, upheld nearly every law which restricted the liberties of Communists. (Note: The ACLU, even though it scaled back its defense of Communists during the Cold War, still came under heavy criticism as a "front" for Communism. Critics included the American Legion, Senator Joseph McCarthy, the HUAC, and the FBI. Several ACLU leaders were sympathetic to the FBI, and as a consequence, the ACLU rarely investigated any of the many complaints alleging abuse of power by the FBI during the Cold War.)

=== 1950s ===
In 1950, the ACLU board of directors asked executive director Baldwin to resign, feeling he lacked the organizational skills to lead the 9,000 (and growing) member organization. Baldwin objected, but a majority of the board elected to remove him from the position, and he was replaced by Patrick Murphy Malin. Under Malin's guidance, membership tripled to 30,000 by 1955 – the start of 24 years of continual growth leading to 275,000 members in 1974. Malin also presided over an expansion of local ACLU affiliates.

The ACLU, controlled by an elite of a few dozen New Yorkers, became more democratic in the 1950s. In 1951, the ACLU amended its bylaws to permit the local affiliates to participate directly in voting on ACLU policy decisions. A bi-annual conference, open to the entire membership, was instituted in the same year; in later decades, it became a pulpit for activist members, who suggested new directions for the ACLU, including abortion rights, death penalty, and rights of the poor.

==== McCarthy era ====
In the 1950s, the ACLU chose not to support Paul Robeson and other leftist defendants, a decision that would later be heavily criticized.

During the early 1950s, the ACLU continued to steer a moderate course through the Cold War. When singer Paul Robeson was denied a passport in 1950, even though he was not accused of any illegal acts, the ACLU chose not to defend him. The ACLU later reversed their stance and supported William Worthy and Rockwell Kent in their passport confiscation cases, which resulted in legal victories in the late 1950s.

In response to communist witch-hunts, many witnesses and employees chose to use the fifth amendment protection against self-incrimination to avoid divulging information about their political beliefs. The national ACLU was divided on whether to defend employees who had been fired merely for pleading the fifth amendment, but the New York affiliate successfully assisted teacher Harry Slochower in his Supreme Court case, which reversed his termination.

The fifth amendment issue became the catalyst for a watershed event in 1954, which finally resolved the ACLU's ambivalence by ousting the anti-communists from ACLU leadership. In 1953, the anti-communists, led by Norman Thomas and James Fly, proposed a set of resolutions that inferred guilt of persons that invoked the fifth amendment. (Note: These resolutions were the first that fell under the ACLU's new organizational rules permitting local affiliates to participate in the vote; the affiliates outvoted the national headquarters and rejected the anti-communist resolutions.) Anti-communist leaders refused to accept the results of the vote and brought the issue up for discussion again at the 1954 bi-annual convention. ACLU member Frank Graham, president of the University of North Carolina, attacked the anti-communists with a counter-proposal, which stated that the ACLU "stand[s] against guilt by association, judgment by accusation, the invasion of privacy of personal opinions and beliefs, and the confusion of dissent with disloyalty". The anti-communists finally gave up and departed the board of directors in late 1954 and 1955, ending an eight-year ambivalence within the ACLU leadership ranks. (Note: After 1955, the ACLU proceeded with firmer resolve against Cold War anti-communist legislation.) The period from the 1940 resolution (and the purge of Elizabeth Flynn) to the 1954 resignation of the anti-communist leaders is considered by many to be an era in which the ACLU abandoned its core principles.

The Supreme Court handed the ACLU two key victories in 1957, in Watkins v. United States and Yates v. United States, both of which undermined the Smith Act and marked the beginning of the end of communist party membership inquiries.

=== 1960s ===
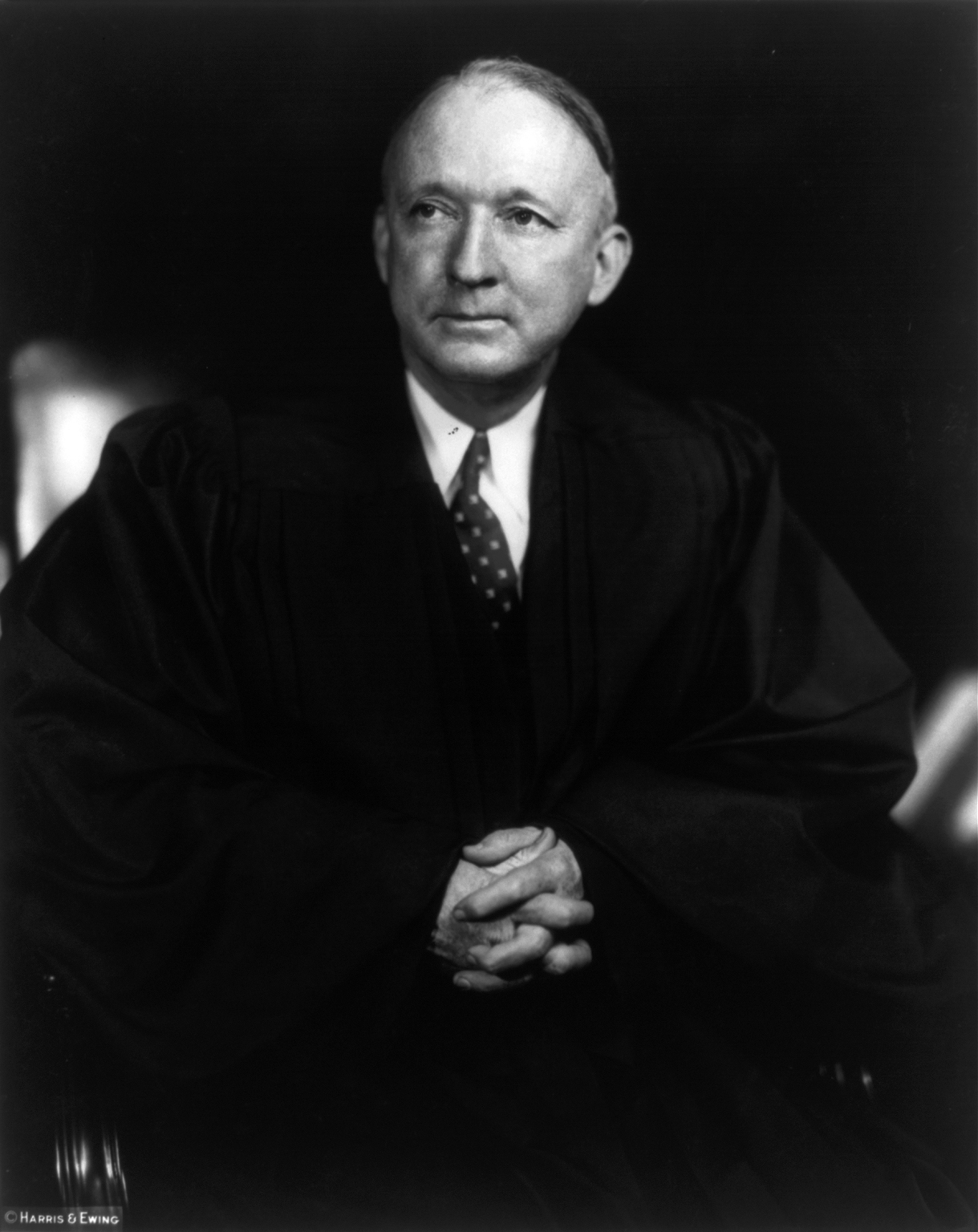
Supreme Court justice Hugo Black often endorsed the ACLU's position on the separation of church and state.

During the decade from 1954 to 1964, ACLU membership rose from 30,000 to 80,000, and by 1965 it had affiliates in seventeen states. During the ACLU's bi-annual conference in Colorado in 1964, the Supreme Court issued rulings on eight cases involving the ACLU; the ACLU prevailed on seven of the eight. The ACLU played a role in Supreme Court decisions reducing censorship of literature and arts, protecting freedom of association, prohibiting racial segregation, excluding religion from public schools, and providing due process protection to criminal suspects. (Note: The ACLU's success arose from changing public attitudes; the American populace was more educated, tolerant, and willing to accept unorthodox behavior.)

In the 1960s, the ACLU, in response to member insistence, turned its attention to the in-class promotion of religion. (Note: In 1960, 42 percent of American schools included Bible reading.) In 1962, the ACLU published a policy statement condemning in-school prayers, observation of religious holidays, and Bible reading. The Supreme Court concurred with the ACLU's position when it prohibited New York's in-school prayers in the 1962 Engel v. Vitale decision.

Cities across America routinely banned movies because they were deemed to be "harmful", "offensive", or "immoral" – censorship which was validated by the 1915 Mutual v. Ohio Supreme Court decision which held movies to be mere commerce, undeserving of first amendment protection.

The ACLU lost an important press censorship case when, in 1957, the Supreme Court upheld the obscenity conviction of publisher Samuel Roth for distributing adult magazines. As late as 1953, books such as Tropic of Cancer and From Here to Eternity were still banned. But public standards rapidly became more liberal through the 1960s, and obscenity was notoriously difficult to define, so by 1971, obscenity prosecutions had halted.

==== Racial discrimination ====
Several civil liberties organizations worked together for progress on the civil rights movement, including the National Association for the Advancement of Colored People (NAACP), the ACLU, and the American Jewish Congress. The NAACP took primary responsibility for Supreme Court cases (often led by lead NAACP attorney Thurgood Marshall), with the ACLU focusing on police misconduct, and supporting the NAACP with amicus briefs. In 1954, the ACLU filed an amicus brief in the case of Brown v. Board of Education, which led to the ban on racial segregation in US public schools. Southern states instituted a McCarthyism-style witch-hunt against the NAACP, attempting to force it to disclose membership lists. The ACLU's fight against racism was not limited to segregation; in 1964, the ACLU provided key support to plaintiffs, primarily lower-income urban residents, in Reynolds v. Sims, which required states to establish the voting districts following the "one person, one vote" principle.

==== Police misconduct ====
During the 1950s and 1960s, the ACLU was responsible for substantially advancing the legal protections against police misconduct. (Note: In 1958, the Philadelphia affiliate was responsible for causing the City of Philadelphia to create the nation's first civilian police review board. In 1959, the Illinois affiliate published the first report in the nation, Secret Detention by the Chicago Police which documented unlawful detention by police.) Some of the most notable ACLU successes came in the 1960s when the ACLU prevailed in a string of cases limiting the power of police to gather evidence; in 1961's Mapp v. Ohio, the Supreme court required states to obtain a warrant before searching a person's home. The Gideon v. Wainwright decision in 1963 provided legal representation to indigents. In 1964, the ACLU persuaded the Court, in Escobedo v. Illinois, to permit suspects to have an attorney present during questioning. And, in 1966, Miranda v. Arizona federal decision required police to notify suspects of their constitutional rights, which was later extended to juveniles in the following year's in re Gault (1967) federal ruling. (Note: Although many law enforcement officials criticized the ACLU for expanding the rights of suspects, police officers also used the services of the ACLU. For example, when the ACLU represented New York City policemen in their lawsuit, which objected to searches of their workplace lockers. In the late 1960s, civilian review boards in New York City and Philadelphia were abolished, over the ACLU's objection.)

==== Civil liberties revolution ====
The 1960s was a tumultuous era in the United States, and public interest in civil liberties underwent explosive growth. Civil liberties actions in the 1960s were often led by young people and often employed tactics such as sit ins and marches. Protests were often peaceful but sometimes employed militant tactics. The ACLU played a central role in all major civil liberties debates of the 1960s, including new fields such as gay rights, prisoner's rights, abortion, rights of the poor, and the death penalty. Membership in the ACLU increased from 52,000 at the beginning of the decade to 104,000 in 1970. In 1960, there were affiliates in seven states, and by 1974 there were affiliates in 46 states. During the 1960s, the ACLU underwent a major transformation in tactics; it shifted emphasis from legal appeals (generally involving amicus briefs submitted to the Supreme Court) to direct representation of defendants when they were initially arrested. At the same time, the ACLU transformed its style from "disengaged and elitist" to "emotionally engaged". The ACLU published a breakthrough document in 1963, titled How Americans Protest, which was borne of frustration with the slow progress in battling racism, and which endorsed aggressive, even militant protest techniques.

After four African-American college students staged a sit-in in a segregated North Carolina department store, the sit-in movement gained momentum across the United States. During 1960–61, the ACLU defended Black students arrested for demonstrating in North Carolina, Florida, and Louisiana. The ACLU also provided legal help for the Freedom Rides in 1961, the integration of the University of Mississippi, the Birmingham campaign in 1963, and the 1964 Freedom Summer. (Note: The NAACP was responsible for managing most sit-in related cases that made it to the Supreme Court, winning nearly every decision. But it fell to the ACLU and other legal volunteer efforts to provide legal representation to hundreds of protestors – white and Black – who were arrested while protesting in the South. The ACLU joined with other civil liberties groups to form the Lawyers Constitutional Defense Committee (LCDC), which provided legal representation to many protesters. The ACLU provided the majority of the funding for the LCDC.)

In 1964, the ACLU opened up a major office in Atlanta, Georgia, dedicated to serving Southern issues. Much of the ACLU's progress in the South was due to Charles Morgan Jr., the charismatic leader of the Atlanta office. Morgan was responsible for desegregating juries (Whitus v. Georgia), desegregating prisons (Lee v. Washington), and reforming election laws. In 1966, the southern office successfully represented African-American congressman Julian Bond in Bond v. Floyd, after the Georgia House of Representatives refused to admit Bond into the legislature on the basis that he was an admitted pacifist opposed to the ongoing Vietnam War. (Note: Another widely publicized case defended by Morgan was that of Army doctor Howard Levy, who was convicted of refusing to train Green Berets. Despite raising the defense that the Green Berets were committing war crimes in Vietnam, Levy lost on appeal in Parker v. Levy, 417 US 733 (1974).)

==== Vietnam War ====
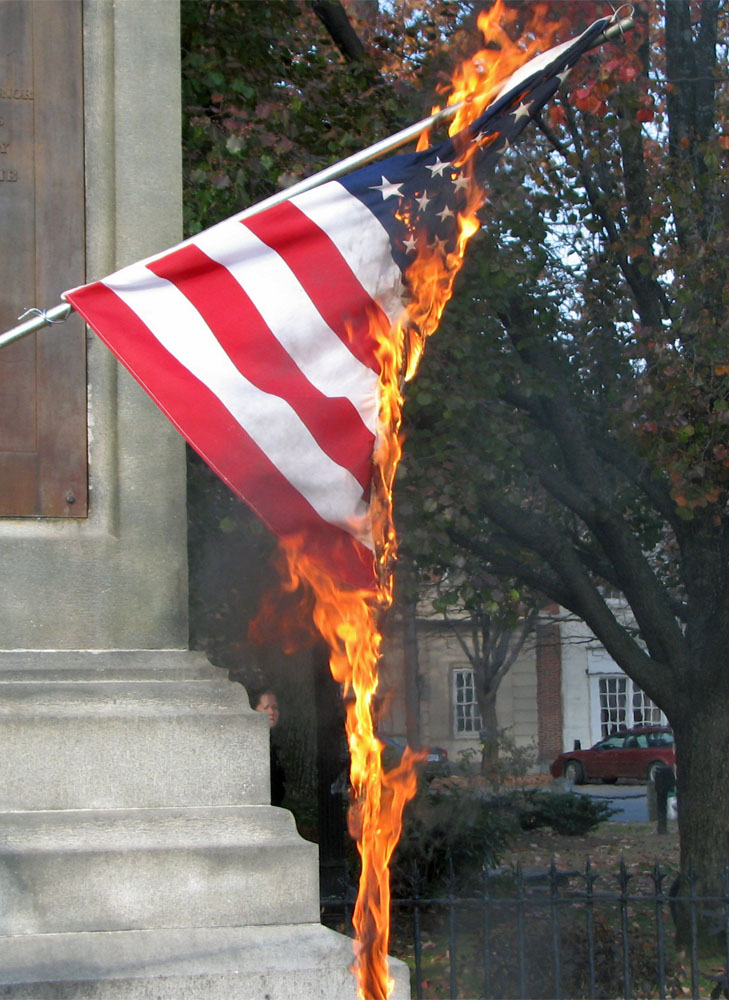
The ACLU contends that the Bill of Rights protects individuals who burn the U.S. flag as a form of expression.

The ACLU was at the center of several legal aspects of the Vietnam war: defending draft resisters, challenging the constitutionality of the war, the potential impeachment of Richard Nixon, and the use of national security concerns to preemptively censor newspapers. David J. Miller was the first person prosecuted for burning his draft card. The New York affiliate of the ACLU appealed his 1965 conviction (367 F.2d 72: United States of America v. David J. Miller, 1966), but the Supreme Court refused to hear the appeal. Two years later, the Massachusetts affiliate took the card-burning case of David O'Brien to the Supreme Court, arguing that the act of burning was a form of symbolic speech, but the Supreme Court upheld the conviction in United States v. O'Brien, 391 US 367 (1968). Thirteen-year-old Junior High student Mary Tinker wore a black armband to school in 1965 to object to the war and was suspended from school. The ACLU appealed her case to the Supreme Court and won a victory in Tinker v. Des Moines Independent Community School District. This critical case established that the government may not establish "enclaves" such as schools or prisons where all rights are forfeited.

The ACLU defended Sydney Street, who was arrested for burning an American flag to protest the reported assassination of civil rights leader James Meredith. In the Street v. New York decision, the court agreed with the ACLU that encouraging the country to abandon one of its national symbols was a constitutionally protected form of expression.

Non-war-related free speech rights were also advanced during the Vietnam war era; in 1969, the ACLU defended a Ku Klux Klan member who advocated long-term violence against the government, and the Supreme Court concurred with the ACLU's argument in the landmark decision Brandenburg v. Ohio, which held that only speech which advocated imminent violence could be outlawed.

A major crisis gripped the ACLU in 1968 when a debate erupted over whether to defend Benjamin Spock and the Boston Five against federal charges that they encouraged draftees to avoid the draft. The board finally agreed to a compromise solution that permitted the ACLU to defend the anti-war activists without endorsing the activist's political views. Some critics of the ACLU suggest that the ACLU became a partisan political organization following the Spock case. After the Kent State shootings in 1970, ACLU leaders took another step toward politics by passing a resolution condemning the Vietnam War. The resolution was based on various legal arguments, including civil liberties violations and claiming that the war was illegal.

=== 1970s ===
==== Watergate era ====
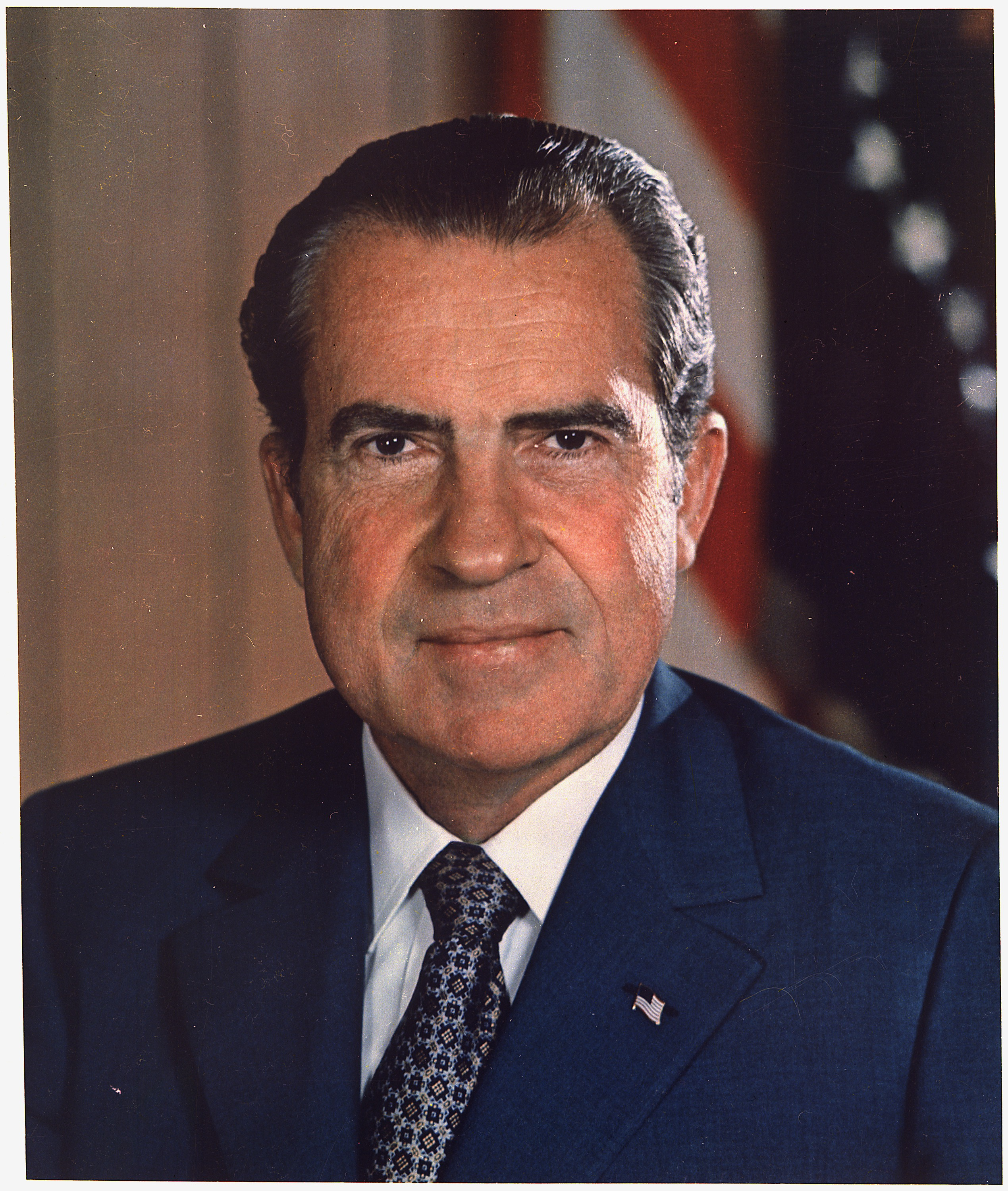
The ACLU was the first national organization to call for the impeachment of Richard Nixon.

The ACLU supported The New York Times in its 1971 suit against the government, requesting permission to publish the Pentagon Papers. The court upheld the Times and ACLU in the New York Times Co. v. United States ruling, which held that the government could not preemptively prohibit the publication of classified information and had to wait until after it was published to take action.

On September 30, 1973, the ACLU became first national organization to publicly call for the impeachment and removal from office of President Richard Nixon. Six civil liberties violations were cited as grounds: "specific proved violations of the rights of political dissent; usurpation of Congressional war-making powers; establishment of a personal secret police which committed crimes; attempted interference in the trial of Daniel Ellsberg; distortion of the system of justice and perversion of other Federal agencies".

==== Enclaves and new civil liberties ====
The decade from 1965 to 1975 saw an expansion of civil liberties. Administratively, the ACLU responded by appointing Aryeh Neier as executive director in 1970. Neier embarked on an ambitious program to expand the ACLU; he created the ACLU Foundation to raise funds and created several new programs to focus the ACLU's legal efforts. By 1974, ACLU membership had reached 275,000.

During those years, the ACLU worked to expand legal rights in three directions: new rights for persons within government-run "enclaves", new rights for members of what it called "victim groups", and privacy rights for citizens in general. At the same time, the organization grew substantially. The ACLU helped develop the field of constitutional law that governs "enclaves", which are groups of persons that live in conditions under government control. Enclaves include mental hospital patients, military members, prisoners, and students (while at school). The term enclave originated with Supreme Court justice Abe Fortas's use of the phrase "schools may not be enclaves of totalitarianism" in the Tinker v. Des Moines decision.

As early as 1945, the ACLU had taken a stand to protect the rights of the mentally ill when it drafted a model statute governing mental commitments. In the 1960s, the ACLU opposed involuntary commitments unless it could be demonstrated that the person was a danger to himself or the community. In the landmark 1975 O'Connor v. Donaldson decision, the ACLU represented a non-violent mental health patient who had been confined against his will for 15 years and persuaded the Supreme Court to rule such involuntary confinements illegal.

Before 1960, prisoners had virtually no recourse to the court system because courts considered prisoners to have no civil rights. That changed in the late 1950s, when the ACLU began representing prisoners subject to police brutality or deprived of religious reading material. In 1968, the ACLU successfully sued to desegregate the Alabama prison system; in 1969, the New York affiliate adopted a project to represent prisoners in New York prisons.

==== Victim groups ====
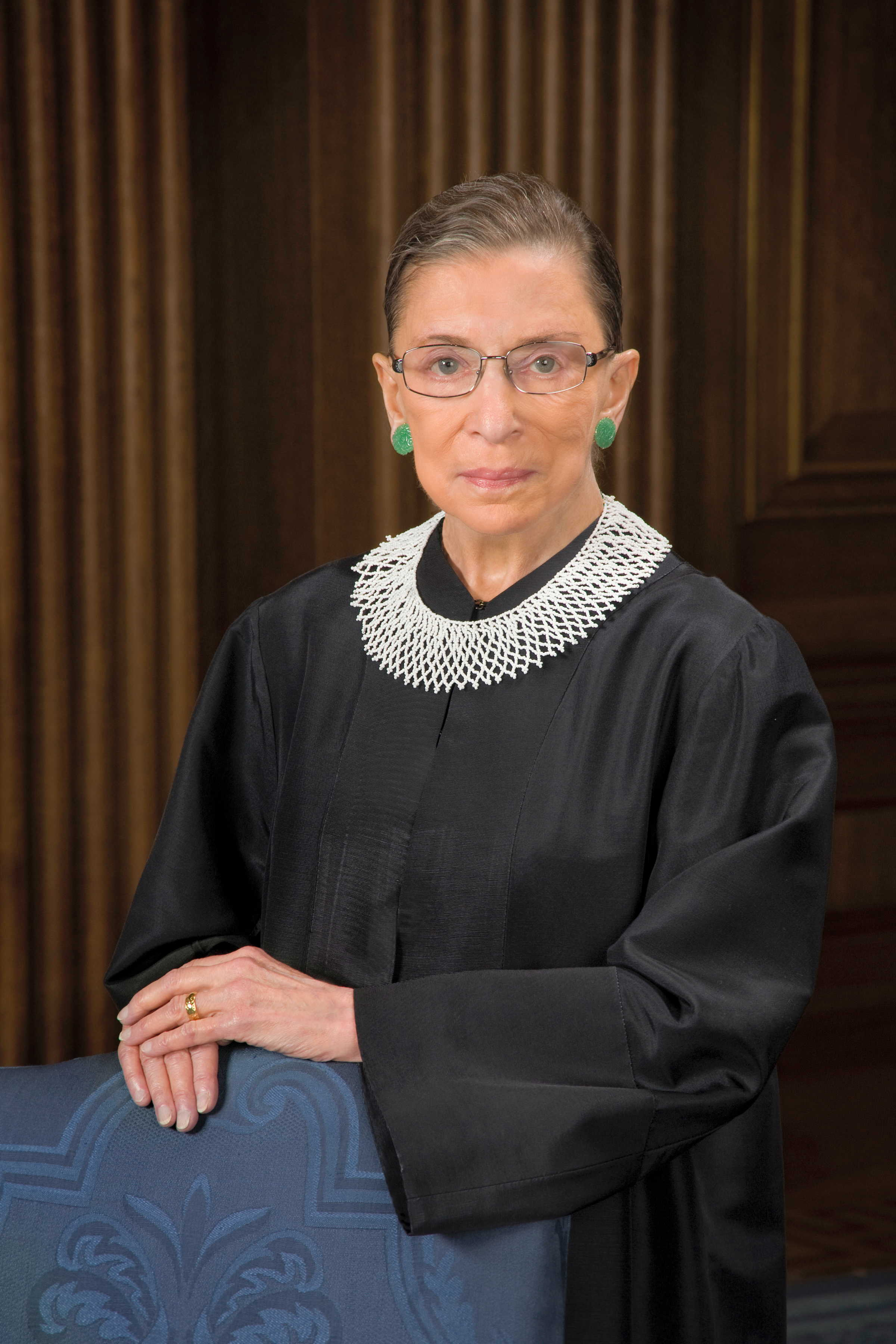
Ruth Bader Ginsburg co-founded the ACLU's Women's Rights Project in 1971. She was later appointed to the Supreme Court of the United States by President Bill Clinton.

During the 1960s and 1970s, the ACLU expanded its scope to include what it referred to as "victim groups", namely women, the poor, and homosexuals. Heeding the call of female members, the ACLU endorsed the Equal Rights Amendment in 1970 and created the Women's Rights Project in 1971. The Women's Rights Project dominated the legal field, handling more than twice as many cases as the National Organization for Women, including breakthrough cases such as Reed v. Reed, Frontiero v. Richardson, and Taylor v. Louisiana.

ACLU leader Harriet Pilpel raised the issue of the rights of homosexuals in 1964, and two years later, the ACLU formally endorsed gay rights. In 1972, ACLU cooperating attorneys in Oregon filed the first federal civil rights case involving a claim of unconstitutional discrimination against a gay or lesbian public school teacher. The US District Court held that a state statute that authorized school districts to fire teachers for "immorality" was unconstitutionally vague, and awarded monetary damages to the teacher.

The rights of the poor were another area that the ACLU expanded. (Note: In 1966 and again in 1968, activists within the ACLU encouraged the organization to adopt a policy overhauling the welfare system and guaranteeing low-income families a baseline income; but the ACLU board did not approve the proposals.) However, the ACLU played a key role in the 1968 King v. Smith decision, where the Supreme Court ruled that welfare benefits for children could not be denied by a state simply because the mother cohabited with a boyfriend.

==== Reproductive Freedom Project ====
The ACLU founded the Reproductive Freedom Project in 1974 to defend individuals the government obstructs in cases involving access to abortions, birth control, or sexual education. According to its mission statement, the project works to provide access to reproductive health care for individuals. The project also opposes abstinence-only sex education, arguing that it promotes an unwillingness to use contraceptives.

In 1980, the Project filed Poe v. Lynchburg Training School & Hospital which attempted to overturn Buck v. Bell, the 1927 US Supreme Court decision which had allowed the Commonwealth of Virginia to legally sterilize persons it deemed to be mentally defective without their permission. Though the Court did not overturn Buck v.Bell, in 1985, the state agreed to provide counseling and medical treatment to the survivors among the 7,200 to 8,300 people sterilized between 1927 and 1979. In 1977, the ACLU took part in and litigated Walker v. Pierce, the federal circuit court case that led to federal regulations to prevent Medicaid patients from being sterilized without their knowledge or consent.

==== Privacy ====
The right to privacy is not explicitly identified in the US Constitution, but the ACLU led the charge to establish such rights in the indecisive Poe v. Ullman (1961) case, which addressed a state statute outlawing contraception. The issue arose again in Griswold v. Connecticut (1965), and this time the Supreme Court adopted the ACLU's position and formally declared a right to privacy. The New York affiliate of the ACLU pushed to eliminate anti-abortion laws starting in 1964, a year before Griswold was decided; in 1967 the ACLU itself formally adopted the right to abortion as a policy. The ACLU led the defense in United States v. Vuitch (1971), which expanded the right of physicians to determine when abortions were necessary. These efforts culminated in one of the most controversial Supreme Court decisions, Roe v. Wade (1973), which legalized abortion throughout the United States. The ACLU successfully argued against state bans on interracial marriage, in the case of Loving v. Virginia (1967).

Related to privacy, the ACLU engaged in several battles to ensure that government records about individuals were kept private and to give individuals the right to review their records. The ACLU supported several measures, including the 1970 Fair Credit Reporting Act, which required credit agencies to divulge credit information to individuals; the 1973 Family Educational Rights and Privacy Act, which provided students the right to access their records; and the 1974 Privacy Act, which prevented the federal government from disclosing personal information without good cause.

==== Allegations of bias ====
In the early 1970s, conservatives and libertarians began to criticize the ACLU for being too political and too liberal. Legal scholar Joseph W. Bishop wrote that the ACLU's trend to partisanship started with its defense of Spock's anti-war protests. Critics also blamed the ACLU for encouraging the Supreme Court to embrace judicial activism. Critics claimed that the ACLU's support of controversial decisions like Roe v. Wade and Griswold v. Connecticut violated the intention of the authors of the Bill of Rights. The ACLU became an issue in the 1988 presidential campaign, when Republican candidate George H. W. Bush accused Democratic candidate Michael Dukakis (a member of the ACLU) of being a "card carrying member of the ACLU".

==== Skokie case ====
In 1977, the National Socialist Party of America, led by Frank Collin, applied to the town of Skokie, Illinois, for a permit to hold a demonstration in the town park. Skokie at the time had a majority population of Jews, totaling 40,000 of 70,000 citizens, some of whom were survivors of Nazi concentration camps. Skokie refused to grant the NSPA a permit and passed ordinances against hate speech and military wear, in addition to requiring an insurance bond. Skokie's Village Council ordered village attorney, Harvey Schwartz, to seek an injunction to stop the demonstration. The ACLU assisted Collin and appealed to federal court, eventually prevailing in NSPA v. Village of Skokie.

The Skokie case was heavily publicized across America, partially because Jewish groups such as the Jewish Defense League and Anti Defamation League strenuously objected to the demonstration, leading many members of the ACLU to cancel their memberships. The Illinois affiliate of the ACLU lost about 25% of its membership and nearly one-third of its budget. The financial strain from the controversy led to layoffs at local chapters. After the membership crisis died down, the ACLU sent out a fund-raising appeal which explained their rationale for the Skokie case and raised over $500,000 ($2,656,507 in 2025 dollars).

=== 1980s ===
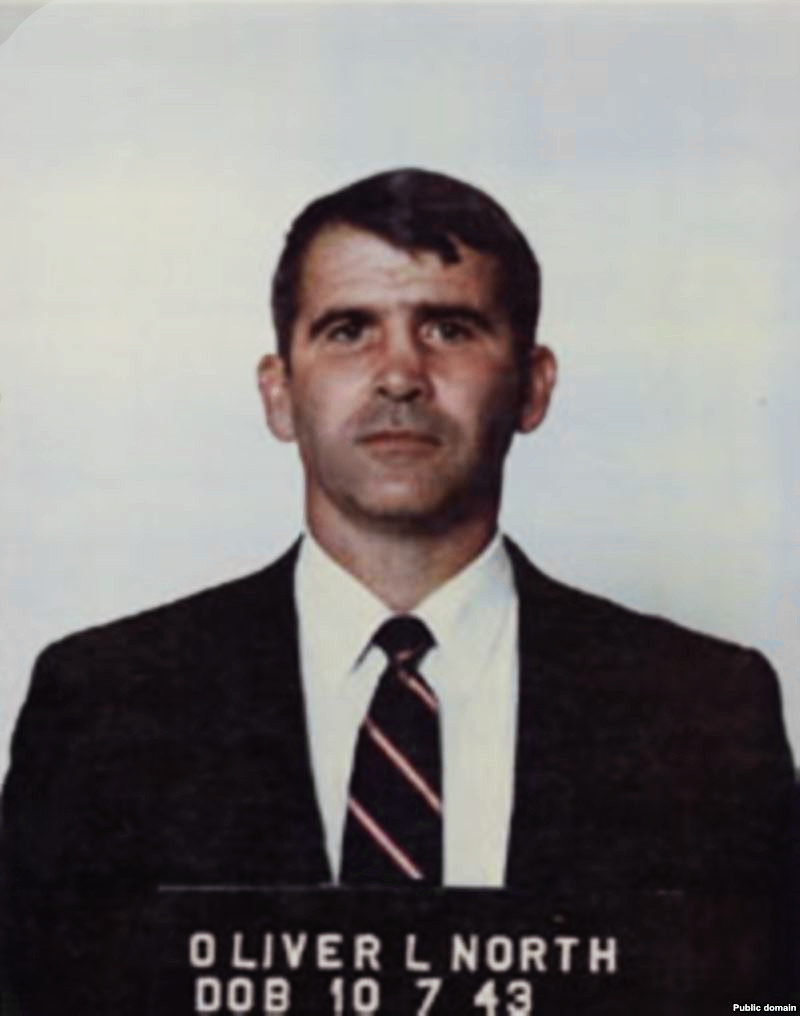
The ACLU defended Oliver North in 1990, arguing that his conviction was tainted by coerced testimony.

The Arkansas 1981 creationism statute, which required schools to teach the biblical account of creation as a scientific alternative to evolution. The ACLU won the case in the McLean v. Arkansas decision.

In 1982, the ACLU became involved in a case involving the distribution of child pornography (New York v. Ferber). In an amicus brief, the ACLU argued that child pornography that violates the three prong obscenity test should be outlawed. However, the law was overly restrictive because it banned artistic displays and non-obscene material. The court did not adopt the ACLU's position.

During the 1988 presidential election, Vice President George H. W. Bush noted that his opponent Massachusetts Governor Michael Dukakis had described himself as a "card-carrying member of the ACLU" and used that as evidence that Dukakis was "a strong, passionate liberal" and "out of the mainstream". The phrase subsequently was used by the organization in an advertising campaign.

=== 1990s ===
In 1997, ruling unanimously in the case of Reno v. American Civil Liberties Union, the Supreme Court voided the anti-indecency provisions of the Communications Decency Act (the CDA), finding they violated the freedom of speech provisions of the First Amendment. In their decision, the Supreme Court held that the CDA's "use of the undefined terms 'indecent' and 'patently offensive' will provoke uncertainty among speakers about how the two standards relate to each other and just what they mean."

=== 2000s ===
In 2006, the ACLU of Washington State joined with a pro-gun rights organization, the Second Amendment Foundation, and prevailed in a lawsuit against the North Central Regional Library District (NCRL) in Washington for its policy of refusing to disable restrictions upon an adult patron's request. Library patrons attempting to access pro-gun web sites were blocked, and the library refused to remove the blocks. In 2012, the ACLU sued the same library system for refusing to disable temporarily, at the request of an adult patron, Internet filters which blocked access to Google Images.

In 2006, the ACLU challenged a Missouri law prohibiting picketing outside veterans' funerals. The ACLU filed the suit in support of the Westboro Baptist Church and Shirley Phelps-Roper, who were threatened with arrest. The Westboro Baptist Church is well known for its picket signs that contain messages such as "God Hates Fags", "Thank God for Dead Soldiers", and "Thank God for 9/11". The ACLU issued a statement calling the legislation a "law that infringes on Shirley Phelps-Roper's rights to religious liberty and free speech." The ACLU prevailed in the lawsuit.

In 2009, the ACLU filed an amicus brief in Citizens United v. FEC, arguing that the Bipartisan Campaign Reform Act of 2002 violated the First Amendment right to free speech by curtailing political speech. This stance on the landmark Citizens United case caused considerable disagreement within the organization, resulting in a discussion about its future stance during a quarterly board meeting in 2010. (Note: On March 27, 2012, the ACLU reaffirmed its stance in support of the Supreme Court's Citizens United ruling, at the same time voicing support for expanded public financing of election campaigns and stating the organization would firmly oppose any future constitutional amendment limiting free speech.)

==== LGBTQ issues ====
In 2000, the ACLU lost the Boy Scouts of America v. Dale case, which had asked the Supreme Court to require the Boy Scouts of America to drop their policy of prohibiting homosexuals from becoming Boy Scout leaders.

In March 2004, the ACLU, along with Lambda Legal and the National Center for Lesbian Rights, sued the state of California on behalf of six same-sex couples who were denied marriage licenses. That case, Woo v. Lockyer, was eventually consolidated into In re Marriage Cases, the California Supreme Court case which led to same-sex marriage being available in that state from June 16, 2008, until Proposition 8 was passed on November 4, 2008. The ACLU, Lambda Legal and the National Center for Lesbian Rights then challenged Proposition 8 and won. In 2011, the ACLU started its Don't Filter Me project, countering LGBTQ-related Internet censorship in public schools in the United States.

On January 7, 2013, the ACLU settled with the federal government in Collins v. United States that provided for the payment of full separation pay to servicemembers discharged under "don't ask, don't tell" since November 10, 2004, who had previously been granted only half that.

=== 2010s ===
In 2012, the ACLU filed suit on behalf of the Ku Klux Klan of Georgia, claiming that the KKK was unfairly rejected from the state's "Adopt-a-Highway" program. The ACLU prevailed in the lawsuit.

==== Allegations of prioritizing civil rights over civil liberties ====
Some have claimed the ACLU is reducing its support of unpopular free speech (specifically, by declining to defend speech made by conservatives) in favor of identity politics, political correctness, and progressivism. Instead, critics contend that the organization has become a progressive advocacy organization intensely focused on identity politics. One basis of these allegations was a 2017 statement the ACLU president made to a reporter after the death of a counter-protester during the 2017 Unite the Right rally in Virginia, where Romero told a reporter that the ACLU would no longer support legal cases of activists that wish to carry guns at their protests. (Note: Another basis for these claims was an internal ACLU memo dated June 2018, discussing factors to evaluate when deciding whether to take a case. The memo listed several factors to consider, including "the extent to which the speech may assist in advancing the goals of white supremacists or others whose views are contrary to our values." The memo's authors stated that the memo did not define a change in official ACLU policy, but was intended as a guideline to assist ACLU affiliates in deciding which cases to take.)

Some analysts viewed this as a retreat from the ACLU's historically strong support of First Amendment rights, regardless of whether minorities were negatively impacted by the speech, citing the ACLU's past support for certain KKK and Nazi legal cases. The ACLU responded to the criticisms by denying that they are reducing their support for unpopular First Amendment causes and listing 27 cases from 2017 to 2021 where the ACLU supported a party holding an unpopular or repugnant viewpoint. (Note: The cases included one which challenged college restrictions on hate speech; a case defending a Catholic school's right to discriminate in hiring; and a case that defended antisemitic protesters who marched outside a synagogue.)

=== 2020s ===
In 2021, Deborah Archer became the first African American to hold the position of president in the organization's 101-year history.

==== Anti-terrorism issues ====
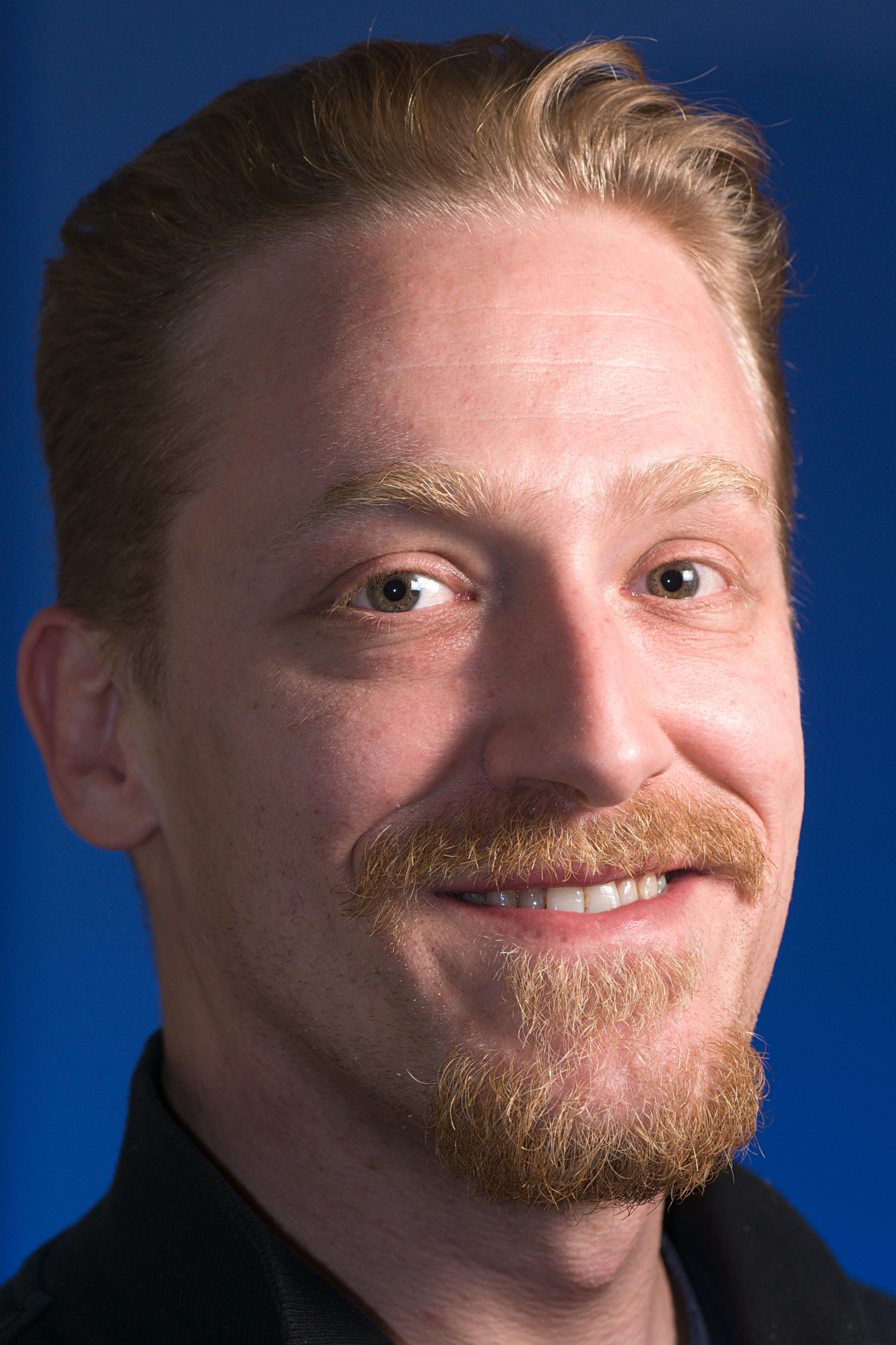
The ACLU represented Internet service provider Nicholas Merrill in a 2004 lawsuit which challenged the government's right to gather information about Internet access secretly.

After the September 11 attacks, the federal government instituted a broad range of new measures to combat terrorism, including the passage of the Patriot Act. The ACLU challenged many of the measures, claiming that they violated rights regarding due process, privacy, illegal searches, and cruel and unusual punishment. (Note: An ACLU policy states: "Our way forward lies in decisively turning our backs on the policies and practices that violate our greatest strength: our Constitution and the commitment it embodies to the rule of law. Liberty and security do not compete in a zero-sum game; our freedoms are the very foundation of our strength and security. The ACLU's National Security Project advocates for national security policies that are consistent with the Constitution, the rule of law, and fundamental human rights. The Project litigates cases relating to detention, torture, discrimination, surveillance, censorship, and secrecy.) During the ensuing debate regarding the proper balance of civil liberties and security, the membership of the ACLU increased by 20%, bringing the group's total enrollment to 330,000. The growth continued, and by August 2008 ACLU membership was greater than 500,000. It remained at that level through 2011.

The ACLU has been a vocal opponent of the Patriot Act of 2001, the PATRIOT 2 Act of 2003, and associated legislation made in response to the threat of domestic terrorism. In response to a requirement of the USA PATRIOT Act, the ACLU withdrew from the Combined Federal Campaign charity drive.

In 2004, the ACLU sued the federal government in American Civil Liberties Union v. Ashcroft on behalf of Nicholas Merrill, owner of an Internet service provider. Under the provisions of the Patriot Act, the government had issued national security letters to Merrill to compel him to provide private Internet access information from some of his customers.

In January 2006, the ACLU filed a lawsuit, ACLU v. NSA, in a federal district court in Michigan, challenging government spying in the NSA warrantless surveillance (2001–2007) controversy. On August 17, 2006, that court ruled that the warrantless wiretapping program was unconstitutional and ordered it ended immediately. (Note: However, the order was stayed pending an appeal. The Bush administration did suspend the program while the appeal was being heard. In February 2008, the US Supreme Court turned down an appeal from the ACLU to let it pursue a lawsuit against the program that began shortly after the September 11 terror attacks.)

The ACLU represented a Muslim-American who was detained but never accused of a crime in Ashcroft v. al-Kidd, a civil suit against former Attorney General John Ashcroft. In January 2010, the American military released the names of 645 detainees held at the Bagram Theater Internment Facility in Afghanistan, modifying its long-held position against publicizing such information. This list was prompted by a Freedom of Information Act lawsuit filed in September 2009 by the ACLU, whose lawyers had also requested detailed information about conditions, rules, and regulations.

==== Trump administration ====
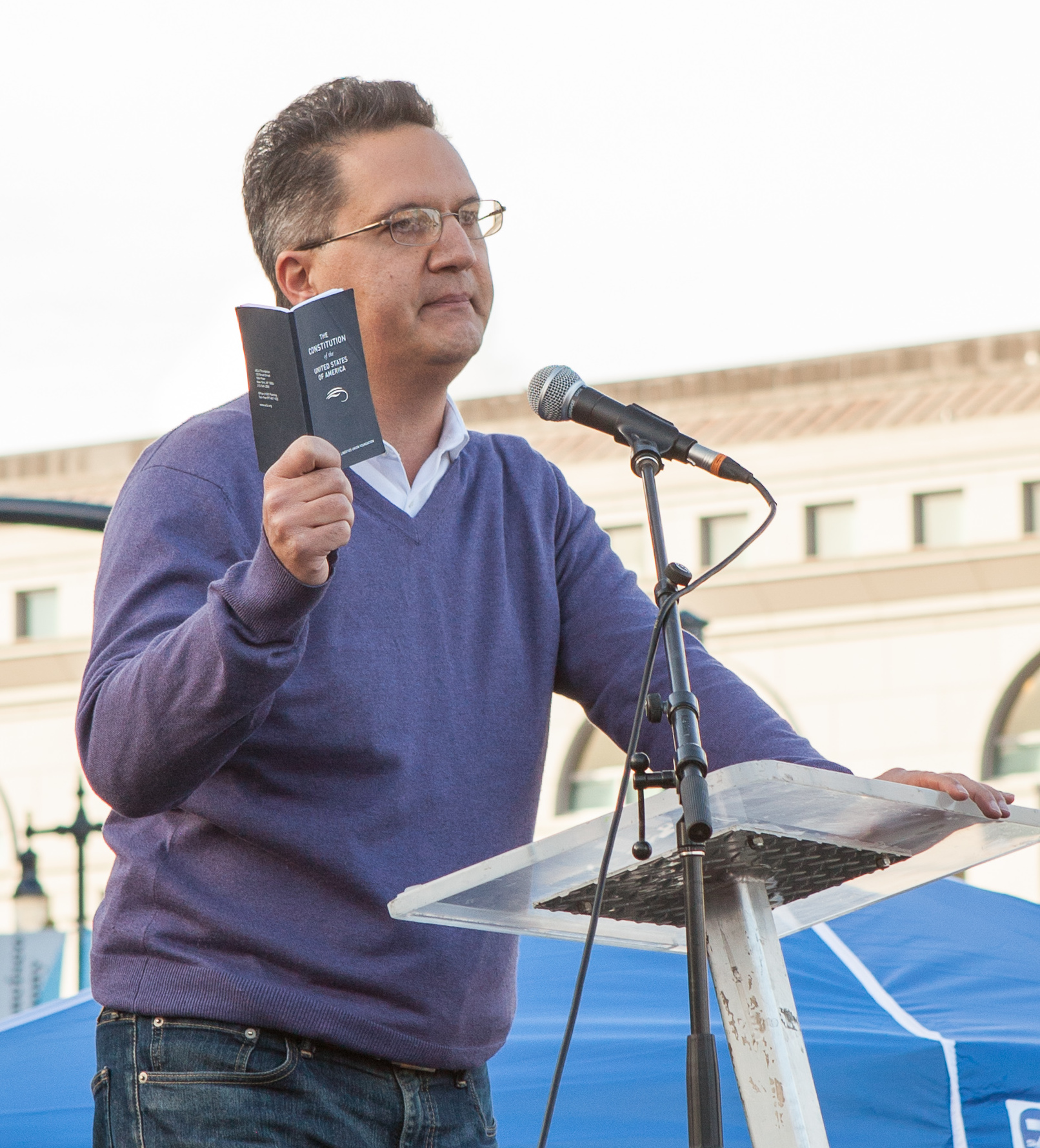
Abdi Soltani, executive director of Northern California ACLU, speaks at a San Francisco protest of the U.S. immigration ban.

Following Donald Trump's election as president on November 8, 2016, the ACLU responded on Twitter by saying: "Should President-elect Donald Trump attempt to implement his unconstitutional campaign promises, we'll see him in court." On January 27, 2017, President Trump signed an executive order indefinitely barring "Syrian refugees from entering the United States, suspended all refugee admissions for 120 days and blocked citizens of seven Muslim-majority countries, refugees or otherwise, from entering the United States for 90 days: Iran, Iraq, Libya, Somalia, Sudan, Syria and Yemen". The ACLU responded by filing a lawsuit against the ban on behalf of Hameed Khalid Darweesh and Haider Sameer Abdulkhaleq Alshawi, who had been detained at JFK International Airport. On January 28, 2017, District Court Judge Ann Donnelly granted a temporary injunction against the immigration order, saying it was difficult to see any harm from allowing the newly arrived immigrants to remain in the country. In response to Trump's order, the ACLU raised more than $24 million from more than 350,000 individual online donations in two days. This amounted to six times what the ACLU normally receives in online donations in a year. Celebrities donating included Chris Sacca (who offered to match other people's donations and ultimately gave $150,000), Rosie O'Donnell, Judd Apatow, Sia, John Legend, and Adele. The number of members of the ACLU doubled in the time from the election to end of January to one million.

Grants and contributions increased from US$106 million reported by the 2016 year-end income statement to $274 million by the 2017 year-end statement. The segment's primary revenue source came from individual contributions in response to the Trump presidency's infringements on civil liberties. Besides filing more lawsuits than during previous presidential administrations, the ACLU has spent more money on advertisements and messaging as well, weighing in on elections and pressing political concerns. This increased public profile has drawn some accusations that the organization has become more politically partisan than in previous decades. In 2018, Harvard Law School professor Alan Dershowitz accused the ACLU of morphing from a "neutral defender of everyone’s civil liberties" into a "hyper-partisan, hard-left political advocacy group."

In December 2025, the ACLU of Minnesota filed a lawsuit on behalf of six community members, alleging Immigration and Customs Enforcement agents violated the constitutional rights of U.S. citizens to "watch, document, and criticize ICE."

During the 2026 midterm elections, the ACLU announced plans to spend $25 million on educational programs related to the elections and ballot measures, particularly in battleground states. The group also announced a $50 million effort to monitor election certification initiatives in key states. In 2026, the ACLU participated in more than 80 legal actions regarding elections, focusing on the issues of discrimination, gerrymandering, voter registration, and mail-in voting.

==== Israel–Palestine ====
In 2022, the ACLU petitioned the US Supreme Court to overturn an Arkansas anti-BDS law mandating that companies pledge not to boycott Israel in order to do business with the state. During the Gaza war, the New York chapter of the ACLU sued Columbia University for banning its campus chapters of Jewish Voice for Peace and Students for Justice in Palestine on the grounds of First Amendment violations. In February 2024, the ACLU signed a letter to US Secretary of Education Miguel Cardona calling on him to reject defining antisemitism to include some political criticism of the government of the state of Israel, claiming it would lead to First Amendment violations.

==== Social media ====
In 2024, the ACLU spoke out against governments banning the social media platform TikTok. The organization specifically condemned a U.S. House bill banning the platform in March 2024, calling the legislation "unconstitutional." In December 2024, the ACLU criticized a federal appeals court ruling that upheld the law, claiming it "sets a flawed and dangerous precedent, one that gives the government far too much power to silence Americans' speech online." The ACLU has also lobbied against the Kids Online Safety Act, a bill meant to protect children online. The organization claims it would censor important conversations online, particularly among marginalized groups.

== See also ==
- American Civil Rights Union – American nonprofit legal organization
- Anti-Defamation League – International Jewish organization
- British Columbia Civil Liberties Association – Canadian organization
- Canadian Civil Liberties Association – Legal advocacy organization
- Common Cause – American watchdog group advocating government reform
- Foundation for Individual Rights and Expression – American free speech organization
- Institute for Justice – American libertarian non-profit public interest law firm
- Liberty (advocacy group) – UK advocacy group and membership organisation
- List of court cases involving the American Civil Liberties Union
- National Emergency Civil Liberties Committee – United States advocacy group
- Political freedom – Concept in history and political thought
- Southern Poverty Law Center – American civil rights organization
