= Securly =

American internet filtering and edtech company

- Website type: Web filtering for schools
- Owner: Golden Gate Capital
- Founders: Vinay Mahadik, Bharath Madhusudan, Nikita Chikate
- Key people: Tammy Wincup (CEO)
- Website: www.securly.com
- Launched: January 2013

Logo used from 2013 to 2020

Securly, Inc. is an educational software company based in San Jose, California and incorporated in Delaware. It develops and sells internet filters and other technologies which primary and secondary schools use to monitor students' web browsing, web searches, video watching, social media posts, emails, online documents, and drives. Securly was founded in January 2013.

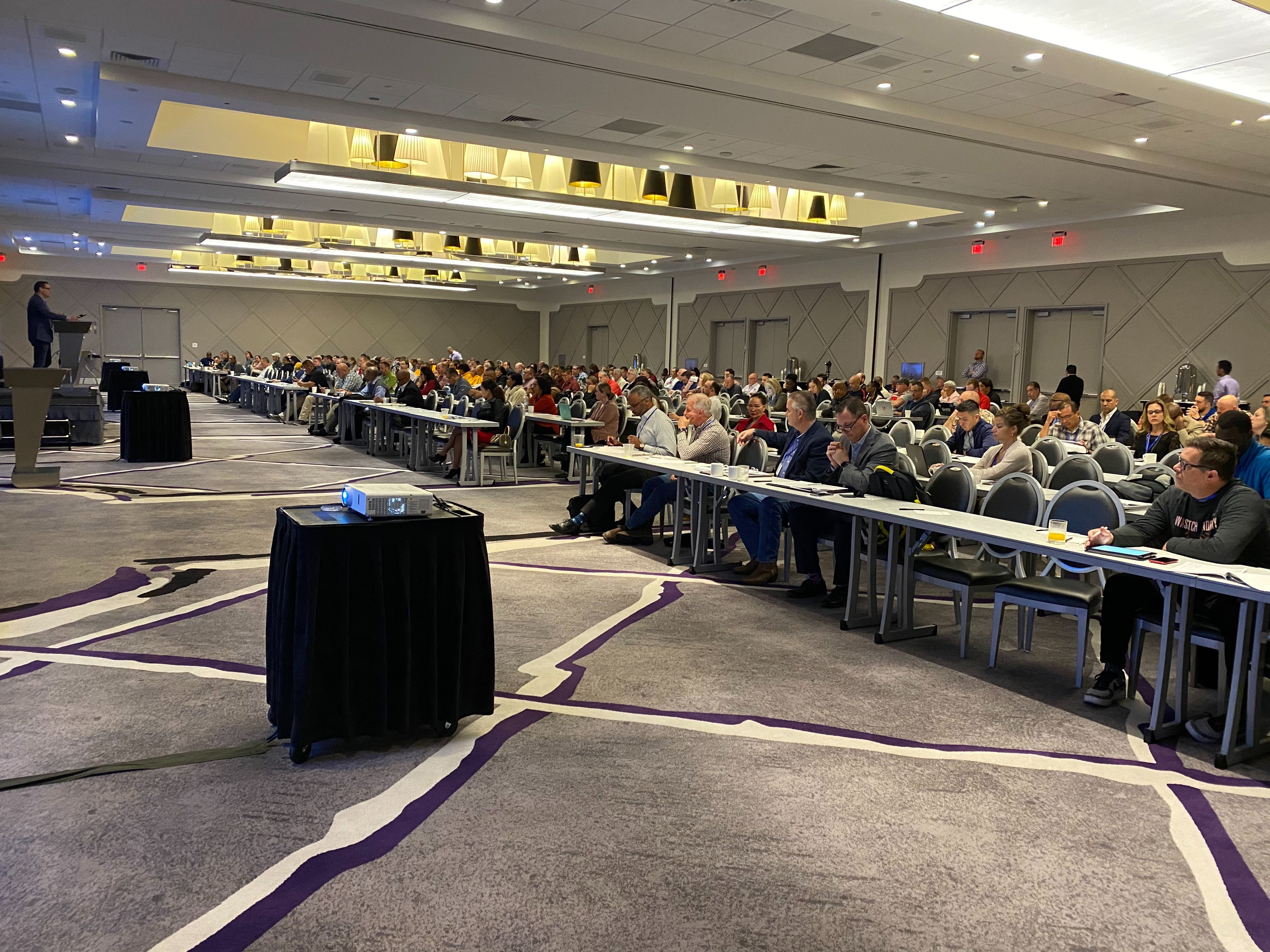
Securly presenting at the National Student Safety Conference held at Las Vegas, Nevada in November 2019.

== Reception ==
Securly has been heavily criticized for providing tools that let schools block websites and invade students' privacy. In 2017, the Milwaukee Journal Sentinel reported on Arrowhead High School's implementation of Securly, which received heavy backlash from parents and students. Securly monitors activity of school-owned equipment and students' own devices that are connected to their school's Wi-Fi. Points of contention included the risk of Securly being hacked, the potential sale of browsing and search history to insurance companies and advertisers, and general privacy concerns. Securly said that they "monitor students' internet searches and social media posts; flag them for references that suggest such things as drug use, cyberbullying or suicide; and share students' internet browsing histories with parents who want them." Common Sense Media director Girard Kelly said events like the Cambridge Analytica scandal and the Equifax data breach show the need to protect students' data, arguing Securly does the opposite by normalizing a "surveillance state" where students have to give up their data without their consent. In 2023, the parents of 2 California students filed a class action lawsuit against Securly, accusing Securly of collecting students' private information without their permission and sold the information to third party vendors.

Securly says that its service allows schools to almost achieve compliance with state and federal requirements such as the Children's Internet Protection Act (CIPA). Securly has claimed its services help prevent school shootings by blocking violent content, but it has faced criticism for providing insufficient data that supports that claim and for the content that it deems violent. In 2020, Securly won the EdTech breakthrough award for use of Artificial Intelligence for Student Safety.

== See also ==
- GoGuardian
