= Lightspeed Systems =

American internet filtering and edtech company

Lightspeed Systems Inc.
- Type: Private
- Founded: 1999
- Headquarters: Austin, Texas
- Products: Lightspeed MDM; Lightspeed Filter; Lightspeed Classroom; Lightspeed Insight; Lightspeed Alert; Lightspeed Signal; Lightspeed StopIt; Lightspeed Hall Monitor
- Website: www.lightspeedsystems.com

Lightspeed Systems is an educational technology company that develops software for internet content filtering, device management, and student activity monitoring for K–12 schools. The company’s products are used by schools to manage student access to online content, monitor device usage, and support administrative oversight of school-issued technology.

== History ==
Lightspeed Systems was founded in the United States in 1999 in Bakersfield, California. The company initially focused on web filtering software for schools, responding to growing use of the internet in classroom settings. Over time, it expanded its product offerings to include device management, classroom management, and student safety monitoring tools.

The company is based in the United States, with Austin, Texas as its corporate headquarters.

The company has received private equity investment from Madison Dearborn Partners and Genstar Capital, which jointly announced equal ownership stakes alongside the founders and management team in March 2022.

== Products and services ==
Lightspeed Systems develops and offers software products for use by educational institutions.

=== Lightspeed MDM ===
Mobile device management software used by school IT staff to configure and manage school-issued devices through administrative policies.

In 2013, Lightspeed Systems introduced a Mobile Learning Essentials package, which included Lightspeed MDM (Mobile Device Management). The product was positioned to support schools in managing increasing numbers of student devices.

=== Lightspeed Filter ===
Web content filtering software used by schools to control access to internet content on school-managed devices and networks, based on administrator-defined policies. The company has described the product as supporting compliance with the Children’s Internet Protection Act (CIPA) by restricting access to certain categories of online content.

Prior to the launch of its agent-based filtering software, Lightspeed Systems offered Rockets, an inline network appliance that provided content filtering at the network level for school environments. In 2017, Lightspeed Systems announced a product called Relay Filter, which was later renamed Lightspeed Filter. The software initially supported Google Chromebooks, with support for macOS, iOS, and Microsoft Windows announced in 2018.

Lightspeed Filter incorporates two proprietary technologies: on-device decryption, which enables filtering of encrypted HTTPS traffic directly on the device without routing through an external proxy, and SmartPlay, which provides granular control over streaming video content including YouTube.

=== Lightspeed Classroom ===
Classroom management software that allows educators to view student device screens and restrict access to applications or websites during instructional periods.

In April 2018, Lightspeed Systems released its classroom management software, Lightspeed Classroom, which the company stated was intended to allow teachers to monitor and control content accessed by students during class time.

In April 2026, a vulnerability was disclosed in the Classroom Chrome extension that allowed unauthorized actors to take control of monitored devices using only the extension's source code and a target user's email address.

=== Lightspeed Insight ===
Edtech analytics software that aggregates information on application usage and device activity within school-managed technology environments, supports data privacy compliance, and provides technology budget insights.

In March 2019, Lightspeed Systems announced the release of its analytics software, originally referred to as Lightspeed Analytics, then Lightspeed Digital Insight, and later Lightspeed Insight for reporting on applications and websites used on school-owned devices.

=== Lightspeed Alert ===
Student safety monitoring software that analyzes student online activity for language patterns associated with safety-related risks, such as self-harm or violence, and generates alerts for designated school personnel.

Lightspeed Systems announced Lightspeed Alert in 2021, stating that the product combines automated AI analysis with human review, drawing on data collected through device agents installed on school-managed devices as well as integrations with third-party platforms, to identify potential safety concerns.

=== Lightspeed Signal ===
App, Network, and device monitoring software intended to provide schools with visibility into the status, connectivity, and performance of school-managed technology systems.

In January 2025, Lightspeed Systems announced the release of Lightspeed Signal, describing it as an IT visibility and monitoring platform developed for K–12 school environments. According to the company, the product was introduced in response to operational challenges reported by school district technology staff, including limited visibility into device usage, application availability, and network performance.

=== Lightspeed StopIt ===
A reporting and alerting platform used by schools to allow students, staff, or community members to submit anonymous reports related to safety concerns, including bullying, threats, or self-harm.

In February 2025, Lightspeed Systems announced that it had acquired STOPit Solutions. The acquisition was intended to combine StopIt’s anonymous reporting platform with Lightspeed Systems’ existing student safety and online activity monitoring products.

=== Lightspeed Hall Monitor ===
A digital hall pass platform that enables teachers and administrators to create, monitor, and manage student passes in real time, with support for building-wide movement tracking and per-student accommodation settings.

In August 2026, Lightspeed Systems announced the release of Lightspeed Hall Monitor as a standalone product for K–12 school districts. Previously available as a built-in feature within Lightspeed Classroom, the standalone version introduced additional capabilities including automatic detection of students who leave class at the same time, individual exception settings for students with IEP or 504 plans, school-level configuration controls, kiosk mode support for shared devices, and a district-wide emergency pass suspension feature.

== Markets ==
Lightspeed Systems primarily serves the K–12 education sector in the United States. Its customers include public school districts, private schools, and charter schools.

Lightspeed Systems (Europe) is the company’s international team, bringing the Lightspeed Suite to the United Kingdom, Europe, Asia-Pacific (APAC) and the Middle East. In the United Kingdom, Lightspeed Systems provides services and software to public schools, private schools, and Multi-academy trusts. APAC and the Middle East have had increased policies regarding student online safety and are two of the newest regions Lightspeed Systems have begun working with.

== Criticism ==
In 2012, Darryl LaGacé, head of IT in San Diego Unified School District, left to go work for Lightspeed Systems after previously procuring a $375,000 contract with them earlier that year. This brought up many concerns and scrutiny.

In 2012, Lightspeed Systems raised questionable behavior when directly mass emailing customers accounts to poach from partner accounts.

== See also ==
- Educational technology
- Internet safety
- Web filtering
