= Veterans' Memorials, Boy Scouts, Public Seals, and Other Public Expressions of Religion Protection Act of 2006 =

The Veterans' Memorials, Boy Scouts, Public Seals, and Other Public Expressions of Religion Protection Act of 2006 ( H.R. 2679, S. 3696, previously the Public Expression of Religion Act of 2005), was a bill passed by the United States House of Representatives on September 26, 2006 by a vote of 244 to 173. It was not voted upon by the Senate. Its intent was two-fold. First, it would have limited the remedies for violation of Establishment Clause rights under the United States Constitution to injunctive relief and declaratory relief only. Second, it would have prevented a plaintiff in such a case from recovering attorneys' fees when they win their case.

It was criticized as a "back door" attempt to circumvent the U.S. Constitution.
