= Gaggle (software) =

American student surveillance software

- Developers: Gaggle.Net, Inc.
- Type: Student surveillance software
- Website: www.gaggle.net

Gaggle is a student surveillance software primarily used in American K-12 school districts.

== History ==
Gaggle, an American student digital safety company based in Dallas, Texas, was founded in 1999. The company is led by Jeff Patterson. The company has collaborated with K-12 districts to manage student safety on school-provided technology accounts. Its services also include Gaggle Therapy & Coaching, a service that connects students with licensed counselors in their state for teletherapy.

== Concerns and criticisms ==
Research by the Center for Democracy & Technology (CDT) shared in 2021 and 2022 raised equity concerns in the use of student surveillance software; CDT found that Black, Hispanic, low-income and rural students faced greater risk of harm due to higher rates of reliance on school-issued devices over personal devices.

In May 2022, the Trevor Project began listing Gaggle as a corporate partner from a $25,000 donation. In October, however, the Trevor Project said it would return the donation "[i]n light of concerns about Gaggle's software having a role in negatively impacting LGBTQ students".

Gaggle has been criticized for its over-surveillance of students and alleged breaches of consent and privacy. In a report published by the Electronic Frontier Foundation, its author criticized student monitoring software such as Gaggle because ambiguous terms could be wrongly flagged. Additionally, flagging of certain terms, especially those relating to LGBTQ+ identities, could reveal personal information about the students. Gaggle dropped LGBTQ+ related terms from its list of phrases that could automatically flag students who use them in January 2023.

Gaggle was also criticized in 2024 by newspaper students at Lawrence High School in Kansas for potentially compromising their journalism sources. Administrators later exempted journalism students from having their content scanned by Gaggle.
