= GoGuardian =

American internet filtering and edtech company

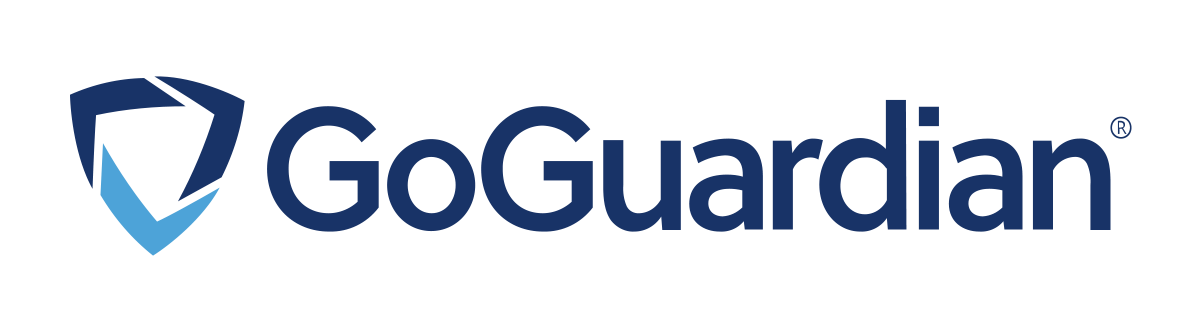
- Industry: Educational technology
- Founded: 2014
- Founders: Advait Shinde; R. Todd Mackey; Aza Steel
- Key people: Rich Preece (CEO)
- Products: GoGuardian Admin; GoGuardian Teacher; GoGuardian Beacon; GoGuardian DNS; GoGuardian Fleet; GoGuardian Director
- Website: www.goguardian.com

GoGuardian is an educational software company founded in 2014 in El Segundo, California. The company's services monitor student activity online, filter content, and alert school officials to possible suicidal or self-harm ideation. It also offers a network-level filtering solution marketed for bring your own device environments, GoGuardian DNS. Concerns have been raised over these functions, claiming the software is spyware.

== History ==
GoGuardian was founded as Liminex Inc. in 2014 in El Segundo, California.

In January 2015, Los Angeles Unified School District (LAUSD) chose GoGuardian to support their 1:1 device rollout program. This provides LAUSD device tracking and grade-level-specific filtering, and facilitates compliance with the Children's Internet Protection Act (CIPA). In June 2015, GoGuardian reported it was installed in over 1,600 of the estimated 15,000 school districts in the United States.

In September 2015, the company released GoGuardian for Teachers, a tool to monitor student activity and control student learning. In January 2016, GoGuardian announced the launch of Google Classroom integration for GoGuardian for Teachers.

In May 2018, GoGuardian was acquired by private equity firm Sumeru Equity Partners and appointed Tony Miller to their board of directors. In August 2018, GoGuardian launched Beacon, a software system installed on school computers that analyzes students' browsing behavior to alert people concerned about students at risk of suicide or self-harm.

GoGuardian merged with Pear Deck in November 2020. In 2024, Rich Preece succeeded co-founder Advait Shinde as CEO.

== Products ==
GoGuardian develops software that includes computer filtering, tracking, monitoring, and management, as well as usage analytics, activity flagging, and theft recovery for ChromeOS devices. GoGuardian also offers filtering functionality for third-party tools such as YouTube.

GoGuardian products allow teachers and administrators to view and snapshot students' computer screens, close and open browser tabs, and see running applications. GoGuardian can collect information about any activity when users are logged onto their accounts, including data originating from a student's webcam, microphone, keyboard, and screen, along with historical data such as browsing history. This collection can be performed whether students connect from school-provided or personally-owned devices.

== Reception ==
Parents have raised privacy concerns over the company's data collection, claiming the software is spyware.

In 2016, researcher Elana Zeide raised the concern that the use of GoGuardian software for suicide prevention, though "well-meaning", could result in "overreach". Zeide further noted that legitimate personal reasons could motivate a student to wish to search for sensitive information in private. According to Zeide, this concern is compounded by the fact that school devices may be the only devices for lower-income students. American School Counselor Association ethics chair Carolyn Stone said that GoGuardian's ability to track web searches conducted at home is "intrusive" and is "conditioning children to accept constant monitoring" as normal.

Until October 2015, GoGuardian software was able to track keystrokes and remotely activate student webcams. GoGuardian said that the features were removed as part of its "ongoing commitment to student privacy," although teachers can still allow the features in the Google Chrome extension settings with student permission.

GoGuardian technical product manager Cody Rice stated in 2016 that schools had control over GoGuardian's collection and management of data and that no client had complained about privacy.

GoGuardian faced criticism by the Electronic Frontier Foundation (EFF) in 2023, over the inconsistent filtering presented by it. The EFF has presented problems with GoGuardian Beacon being used to replace social workers and other mental health professionals in a school landscape. The EFF has also stressed the possibility of using the data collected by GoGuardian to track and to advertise to children under the age of 13. GoGuardian has also faced criticism for flagging and blocking LGBTQ keywords.

== Recognition ==
- In 2018, GoGuardian was named as the 27th fastest growing technology company in North America.
- In January 2016, two of the company's co-founders, Aza Steel and Advait Shinde, were named to Forbes magazine's annual "30 Under 30" list in the Education category.
- International Design Awards Gold: GoGuardian Teacher
- 2016 Awards of Excellence Tech and Learning

== See also ==
- Securly – Web filter with similar functions, also criticized for privacy invasion
