= The terrorists have won =

Rhetorical phrase

"...the terrorists have won" or "...then the terrorists win" are rhetorical phrases which were widely used in the United States in the wake of the September 11 attacks. The phrase says "that if we pursue some particular course of action, why then, the terrorists have won" (as explained by Jeff Greenfield of CNN).

== Etymology ==
The expression had been used before 2001. In 1986, an article in the Journal of the American Bar Association (ABA) reported:

ABA President William Falsgraf has wisely pointed out that we must not alter fundamental precepts of U.S. law in responding to terrorism. "If we do," Falsgraf said, "the terrorists have won."

== History ==
In 1995, an editorial about the response to the Oklahoma City bombing in the Ocala Star-Banner, of Ocala, Florida concluded: "Our response to terrorism should be carefully measured. If our First Amendment rights suffer as a result of the awful domestic terrorist attack in Oklahoma City the terrorists have indeed, won." At the same time, an editorial in the Victoria Advocate of Victoria, Texas said: "If Americans begin to yield their own freedoms at home, the terrorists have won."

In the months after the September 11 attacks, the expression was often used. One of the most famous instances was on November 4, 2001, by Ellen DeGeneres, who was hosting the Emmy Awards, which had been postponed twice that year for worries that a showy celebration would seem inappropriate in the wake of the attacks. To lighten the mood, she quipped: "We're told to go on living our lives as usual, because to do otherwise is to let the terrorists win, and really, what would upset the Taliban more than a gay woman wearing a suit in front of a room full of Jews?"

== See also ==
- Appeal to consequences
- Appeal to fear
- Appeal to pity
- Black and white thinking
- Cut and run
- False dilemma
- List of fallacies
- Stay the course
- Terrorism
- Think of the children
- War hawk
- You're either with us, or against us
