= Think of the children =

Rhetorical cliché phrase

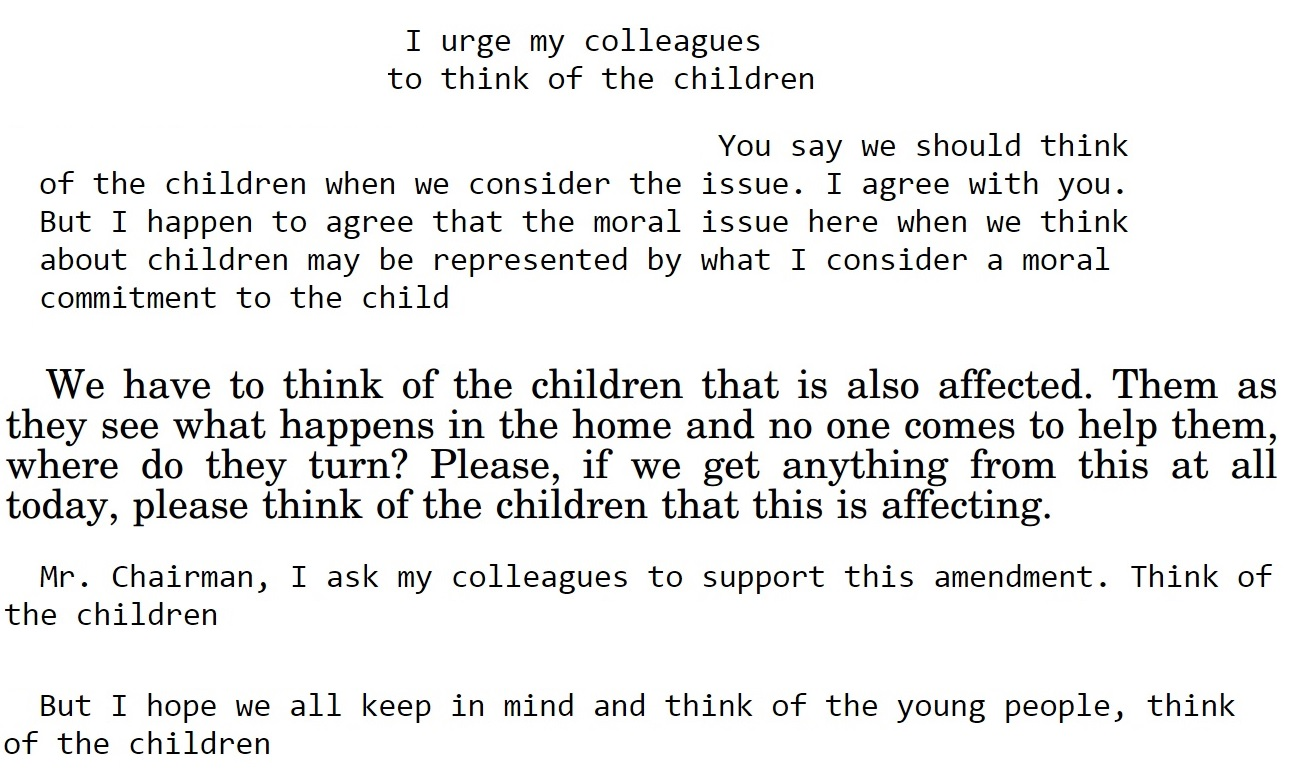
Five uses of "think of the children" before the United States Congress

"Think of the children" (also "What about the children?") is a cliché that evolved into a rhetorical tactic. In the literal sense, it refers to children's rights (as in discussions of child labor). In debate, it is a plea for pity that is used as an appeal to emotion, and therefore may become a logical fallacy.

== History ==
Art, Argument, and Advocacy (2002) argued that the appeal substitutes emotion for reason in debate. Ethicist Jack Marshall wrote in 2005 that the phrase's popularity stems from its capacity to stunt rationality, particularly discourse on morals. "Think of the children" has been invoked by censorship proponents to shield children from perceived danger. Community, Space and Online Censorship (2009) argued that classifying children in an infantile manner, as innocents in need of protection, is a form of obsession over the concept of purity. A 2011 article in the Journal for Cultural Research observed that the phrase grew out of a moral panic.

It was an exhortation in the 1964 Disney film Mary Poppins, when the character of Mrs. Banks pleaded with her departing nanny not to quit and to "think of the children!" The phrase was popularized as a satiric reference on the animated television program The Simpsons in 1996, when character Helen Lovejoy pleaded variations of "Will someone please think of the children?" multiple times during a contentious debate by citizens of the fictional town of Springfield.

In the 2012 Georgia State University Law Review, Charles J. Ten Brink called Lovejoy's use of "Think of the children" a successful parody. The appeal's subsequent use in society was often the subject of mockery. After its popularization on The Simpsons, an appeal to the welfare of children has been called "Lovejoy's Law", the "Lovejoy argument", the "Mrs. Lovejoy fallacy", the "Helen Lovejoy defence", "Helen Lovejoy syndrome", the "Lovejoy Trap", and "think-of-the-children-ism".

In 2018, author Nassim Nicholas Taleb coined the term 'pedophrasty' for an argument "involving children to prop up a rationalization ... Often done with the aid of pictures".

== Child advocacy ==
Think of the children ... freed of the crushing burden of dangerous and demeaning work.

— Bill Clinton

"Think of the children" has been used in its literal sense to advocate for the rights of children. Early usage during the 20th century included writings in 1914 by the National Child Labor Committee criticizing child labor standards in the United States. U.S. President Bill Clinton used the phrase in a 1999 speech to the International Labour Organization, asking his audience to imagine a significant reduction in child labor: "Think of the children ... freed of the crushing burden of dangerous and demeaning work, given back those irreplaceable hours of childhood for learning and playing and living."

The phrase's literal use extends into the 21st century, with Sara Boyce of the Children's Law Centre in Northern Ireland drawing on it to advocate for the legal rights of the region's children. The 2008 book Child Labour in a Globalized World used the phrase to call attention to the role of debt bondage in child labor. Sara Dillon of Suffolk University Law School used the phrase "What about the children" in her 2009 book, International Children's Rights, to focus on child-labor program conditions. Benjamin Powell used the phrase differently in his book, Out of Poverty: Sweatshops in the Global Economy, writing that in the absence of child labor, some youth faced starvation. In a 2010 book on human rights, Children's Rights and Human Development, child psychiatrist Bruce D. Perry used the phrase "think of the children" to urge clinicians to incorporate a process sensitive to developmental stages when counseling youth.

== Debate tactic ==
=== Logical fallacy ===
In their 2002 book, Art, Argument, and Advocacy: Mastering Parliamentary Debate, John Meany and Kate Shuster called the use of the phrase "Think of the children" in debate a type of logical fallacy and an appeal to emotion. According to the authors, a debater may use the phrase to emotionally sway members of the audience and avoid logical discussion. They provide an example: "I know this national missile defense plan has its detractors, but won't someone please think of the children?" Their assessment was echoed by Margie Borschke in an article for the journal Media International Australia incorporating Culture and Policy, with Borschke calling its use a rhetorical tactic.

Ethicist Jack Marshall described "Think of the children!" as a tactic used in an attempt to end discussion by invoking an unanswerable argument. According to Marshall, the strategy succeeds in preventing rational debate. He called its use an unethical manner of obfuscating debate, misdirecting empathy towards an object which may not have been the focus of the original argument. Marshall wrote that although the phrase's use may have a positive intention, it evokes irrationality when repeatedly used by both sides of a debate. He concluded that the phrase can transform the observance of regulations into an ethical quandary, cautioning society to avoid using "Think of the children!" as a final argument.

In his 2015 syndicated article "Think Of The Children", Michael Reagan criticized the phrase's use by politicians. According to Reagan, politicians needed to stop using children as tools when arguing for favored governmental programs. He called the tactic an illogical argument, an act of desperation by those who felt they had a weaker case with reason-based arguments. Noting that it has been used by Democrats and Republicans alike in the United States, Reagan called the tactic "obvious political BS".

=== Moral panic ===
The phrase, used by Congresswoman Mia Love

The Journal for Cultural Research published an article in 2010 by Debra Ferreday, which was republished in the 2011 book Hope and Feminist Theory. According to Ferreday, media use of "Won't someone think of the children!" had become common in a climate of moral panic. She suggested that the phrase was becoming so common that it could become another Godwin's law.

In a 2011 article for the journal Post Script, Andrew Scahill wrote about the power of children in rhetoric to create an untenable stance for an opposing viewpoint. According to Scahill, an individual arguing "for the children" makes it extremely difficult for an opponent to hold a "not for the children" position. Cassandra Wilkinson discussed the impact of "think of the children" rhetoric in a 2011 article for IPA Review. Wilkinson cited research by No Fear: Growing Up in a Risk-Averse Society author Tim Gill that hypersensitivity in defending children from potential harm has the adverse effect of contributing to the inability of youth to own their choices and react to dangerous situations. In the New Statesman, Laurie Penny characterized the tactic as a political belief system and called it "think-of-the-children-ism".

Elizabeth Bruenig wrote in a 2014 article for First Things that moralizing with the phrase was commonly seen in discussions of sexuality, attributing this to society's increasing perception of morality as a feminine domain. Bruenig also cited the labeling of NBC's refusal to broadcast a movie trailer about abortion as "think-of-the-children-ism". The argument is also routinely used in discussions around drug use and drug policy.

=== Censorship ===
Scott Beattie wrote in his 2009 book, Community, Space and Online Censorship, that the question "Will no one think of the children?" was often raised by individuals advocating censorship out of a concern that youth might view material deemed inappropriate. According to Beattie, youngsters were cast as potential casualties of online sexual predators to increase regulation of the Internet; characterizing children as infantile evoked a concept of innocence which was a form of obsession over the concept of purity.

For Make magazine, Cory Doctorow wrote in a 2011 article that "Won't someone think of the children?!" was used by irrational individuals to support arguments about the dangers to youth of the "Four Horsemen of the Infocalypse": "pirates", terrorists, organized crime, and child pornographers. According to Doctorow, the phrase was used to stifle discussion of underlying issues and halt rational analysis. He observed its frequent use when society was determining an appropriate approach to the legal aspects of computing.

In his 2013 book, Fervid Filmmaking, Mike Watt discussed the history of censorship relative to the United Kingdom's Obscene Publications Act 1959 and noted that films banned during that period became known as "video nasties". Watt called a current interpretation of such censorship the "Think of the Children" characterization. Brian M. Reed wrote in his book, Nobody's Business (also published that year), that the phrase was devoid of substance and could be replaced for comic effect with "How many kittens must die?"

For Reason in 2015, journalist Brendan O'Neill wrote that Marjorie Heins' Not in Front of the Children: Indecency, Censorship, and the Innocence of Youth cited the centuries-long use by governments of the prevention of "harm to minors" as an excuse to increase censorship and control. According to O'Neill, the use of "Won't somebody please think of the children?" in contemporary culture had greatly increased and was a means of exerting moral authority with emotional blackmail.

== Popularization ==
=== Film and television ===
The Simpsons character Helen Lovejoy delivering her signature line, "Ohhh, won't somebody please think of the children!"

According to Kathryn Laity, early use of the phrase may have stemmed from its appearance in the 1964 Walt Disney Pictures film Mary Poppins. In an opening scene, the character of Mrs. Banks pleads with her nanny not to quit by begging her to "think of the children!". Laity wrote that the popular use of the phrase evokes strong feelings in those who object to a nanny state, pointing out the conflict in the United States between the country's conservatism (derived from the Puritans) and its desire to use sex in advertising.

Before the phrase's exposure in The Simpsons, most Americans first became accustomed to it during the 1980s in a charity commercial with Sally Struthers for Christian Children's Fund. At the end of the commercial Struthers pleaded with the viewers, "Won't somebody please think of the children?" It was also used in John Huston's 1982 film Annie, spoken by Eleanor Roosevelt as Annie sings "Tomorrow" to Franklin D. Roosevelt at the White House in order to get Oliver Warbucks' begrudging support for New Deal policies he opposes.

"Think of the children" was popularized largely by character Helen Lovejoy, wife of Reverend Lovejoy, on the television program The Simpsons. Lovejoy (who first appeared in 1990) repeatedly exclaimed, "Think of the children!" in several episodes of the series. She first used the phrase in the episode "Much Apu About Nothing" by David X. Cohen, which aired in 1996, imploring the city mayor to keep bears from crossing the wildland–urban interface. Lovejoy's exhortation became increasingly overwrought with each subsequent use.

The Simpsons writer Bill Oakley said in the 2005 DVD commentary on the episode that the motivation for the phrase on the show was to emphasize how "think of the children" was used in debate; irrelevant, it sidetracked discussion from the original issues. Lovejoy used variations of the phrase, including "Oh, won't somebody please think of the children" and "What about the children", shrieking it most often when residents of the fictional town of Springfield debated a contentious problem or argued about politics and logic failed. Lovejoy's comic use of the phrase on The Simpsons satirized its use in public discourse.

=== Lovejoy's Law ===
After the popularization of the phrase on The Simpsons, its use in society was often ridiculed, and came to be referred to as "Lovejoy's Law" in internet culture as early as 2006, probably independently coined several times. In the Toronto Star, journalist Edward Keenan defined "Lovejoy's Law" as a warning that the phrase is a probable diversion from a weak logical stance, writing that true empathy toward children involved rational argument rather than manipulation. In an article for Ireland's Sunday Independent, Carol Hunt called the use of the phrase in political debate the "Helen Lovejoy defence" and wrote that it is also known as the "Helen Lovejoy syndrome". According to Hunt, it is often invoked in reference to hypothetical children rather than real children affected by a problem.

In a Georgia State University Law Review article, Michigan State University College of Law professor Charles J. Ten Brink wrote that Helen Lovejoy's signature phrase ("What about the children?") was an adept and effective parody. According to The Canberra Times, the phrase's 2009 use to support Internet censorship by the Department of Communications of the government of Australia was evocative of Helen Lovejoy.

In his book, The Myth of Evil, Phillip A. Cole wrote that Helen Lovejoy's plea assumed that children were pure, unadulterated potential casualties who required constant defense from danger. Cole contrasted this notion with character Bart Simpson, who prefers creating disorder to conformity and adherence to regulations. According to Cole, this exemplifies the dual perception of children by society: guileless potential prey and malevolent entities to be distrusted. Cole wrote that throughout history, the child has represented humanity's savage past and its optimistic future. Jo Johnson contributed a chapter, "Won't Somebody Think of the Children?", to the book Mediating Moms, in which she analyzed the phrase's use in animated media (including The Simpsons). According to Johnson, the phrase was a key example of popular cultural depictions of mothers as neurotic and filled with anxiety about moral values.

== See also ==
- Adultism
- Age appropriateness
- Appeal to consequences
- Appeal to fear
- Censorship by political correctness
- Childism
- Appeal to worse problems
- Best interests
- Blood libel
- Child protection
- Child safety
- Daisy (advertisement)
- Every time you masturbate... God kills a kitten
- False dilemma
- Family values
- Family-friendly
- Ignoratio elenchi
- Lie-to-children
- List of fallacies
- Moral suasion
- Parental controls
- Save Our Children, a slogan made famous by Anita Bryant
- Thought-terminating cliché
