= Free Expression Policy Project =

American free speech advocacy and research organization

- Organization banner image
- Abbreviation: FEPP
- Formation: 2000; 26 years ago
- Founder: Marjorie Heins
- Type: Nonprofit organization
- Legal status: Inactive
- Purpose: Freedom of speech research and advocacy
- Location: Manhattan, New York
- Official language: English
- Affiliations: National Coalition Against Censorship; Brennan Center for Justice at New York University Law School
- Website: www.fepproject.org

The Free Expression Policy Project (FEPP) is an organization devoted to assisting researchers with assembling information related to freedom of speech, media democracy, and copyright, and advocating for these issues. Civil liberties lawyer Marjorie Heins founded the nonprofit organization in 2000. Based in Manhattan, New York, it was initially associated with the National Coalition Against Censorship, and subsequently operated as part of the Democracy Program of the Brennan Center for Justice at New York University Law School.

The FEPP conducted a survey in 2001 which revealed that online monitoring software, including Net Nanny, SurfWatch, and Cybersitter, cast too broad a net and often blocked legitimate educational websites in their attempts to censor material from youths. In 2003, the organization assisted 33 academics in filing a friend-of-the-court brief challenging a law which restricted the sale of violent video games to minors. In coordination with the Brennan Center for Justice, the FEPP released a public policy report in 2006 on the inefficiency of Internet filtering; the report concluded that freedom of expression was harmed by such online censorship activity. In 2007, the FEPP became an independent organization.

The New Walford Guide to Reference Resources praised the FEPP website for its links to resources on freedom of expression and censorship. FEPP has been characterized by the Austin American-Statesman as a think tank devoted to researching the First Amendment to the United States Constitution. The Denver Post described the organization as a censorship watchdog organization, and a separate article from the same newspaper called it a left-of-center politically aligned group, which advocated for both intellectual freedom and artistic freedom.

== History ==
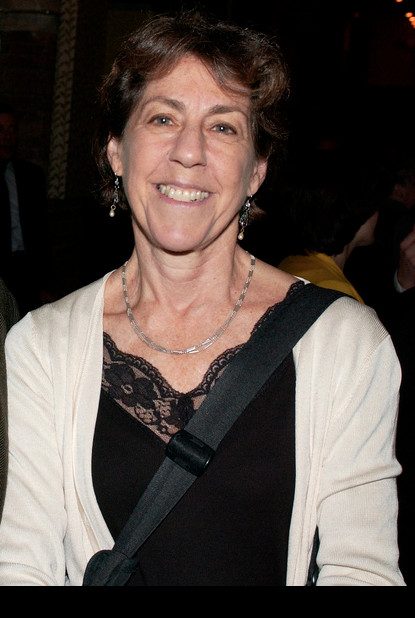
Marjorie Heins at an event for the National Coalition Against Censorship in 2009

The Free Expression Policy Project was founded by Marjorie Heins, who became its initial director. It was formed as a nonprofit organization. Founded in 2000, the organization formed with goals of assisting researchers with assembling information related to freedom of speech, media democracy, and copyright, and advocating for these issues. It started as an outgrowth of the National Coalition Against Censorship. Prior to founding the organization, Heins served as director of the Art Censorship Project at the American Civil Liberties Union. The FEPP monitors incidents of censorship against artists, and is based in Manhattan, New York.

A 2001 survey conducted by the organization found that popular online filters including Net Nanny, SurfWatch, and Cybersitter had significant problems, and blocked legitimate websites, including the website of US Congressman Richard Armey because his site included his nickname, "Dick". The University of Kansas Archie R. Dykes Medical Library was blocked by SurfWatch because the word "dykes" appeared on the site. In 2003, Stephanie Greist served as communications director for the Free Expression Policy Project.

In 2003, the Free Expression Policy Project assisted 33 academics specializing in journalism, with filing a friend-of-the-court brief challenging a law which restricted the sale of violent video games to youths. In 2004 the organization operated at the National Coalition Against Censorship. In 2005 the organization was part of the Brennan Center for Justice at New York University Law School. Within the Brennan Center for Justice, the FEPP operated through the Democracy Program at the law school. In 2006 the organization, in collaboration with the Brennan Center for Justice, released a report on the inefficiency of Internet filtering. The 87-page report concluded that academic-based censorship of material on the Internet was far too broad and harmed free expression of ideas. The FEPP became independent from both the National Coalition Against Censorship and the Brennan Center for Justice in 2007.

The National Coalition Against Censorship posted FEPP articles until 2015 and posted a note in December 2017 suggesting it had ceased operating at that time.

== Analysis ==
The New Walford Guide to Reference Resources praised the FEPP website for its links to other websites about freedom of expression and censorship. Austin American-Statesman described the Free Expression Policy Project as a think tank dedicated to the First Amendment to the United States Constitution. A 2002 article in The Denver Post called the FEPP a watchdog organization which monitored censorship. In a 2004 article, The Denver Post characterized the organization as a think tank from the left-of-center political alignment, which advocated for both intellectual freedom and artistic freedom. The New York Times called the FEPP an organization which was critical of censorship of depictions of violence in the media.

== See also ==
- Academic freedom
- Censorship
- Cutting the Mustard: Affirmative Action and the Nature of Excellence
- National Coalition Against Censorship
- Not in Front of the Children: "Indecency," Censorship, and the Innocence of Youth
- Prior restraint
- Sex, Sin, and Blasphemy: A Guide to America's Censorship Wars
- Suppression of dissent
