= Appeal to emotion =

Informal logical fallacy

Appeal to emotion or argumentum ad passiones (meaning the same in Latin) is an informal fallacy characterized by the manipulation of the recipient's emotions in order to win an argument, especially in the absence of factual evidence. This kind of appeal to emotion is irrelevant to or distracting from the facts of the argument (a so-called "red herring") and encompasses several logical fallacies, including appeal to consequences, appeal to fear, appeal to flattery, appeal to pity, appeal to ridicule, appeal to spite, and wishful thinking.

Appeal to emotion is an application of social psychology. It is only fallacious when the emotions that are elicited are irrelevant to evaluating the truth of the conclusion and serve to distract from rational consideration of relevant premises or information. For instance, if a student says "If I get a failing grade for this paper I will lose my scholarship. It's not plagiarized." the emotions elicited by the first statement are not relevant to establishing whether the paper was plagiarized.

Appeals to emotion are intended to cause the recipient of the information to experience feelings such as fear, pity, or joy, with the end goal of convincing the person that the statements being presented by the fallacious argument are true or false, respectively.

== Classical times ==
The power of emotions to influence judgment, including political attitudes, has been recognized since classical antiquity. Aristotle, in his treatise Rhetoric, described emotional arousal as critical to persuasion, "The orator persuades by means of his hearers, when they are roused to emotion by his speech; for the judgments we deliver are not the same when we are influenced by joy or sorrow, love or hate." Aristotle warned that emotions may create beliefs where none existed, or change existing beliefs, and may enhance or decrease the strength with which a belief is held. Seneca, in the first century CE, similarly warned that "Reason herself, to whom the reins of power have been entrusted, remains mistress only so long as she is kept apart from the passions."

In the 17th century, French scientist and philosopher, Blaise Pascal wrote that "People [...] arrive at their beliefs not on the basis of proof, but on the basis of what they find attractive." Baruch Spinoza characterized emotions as having the power to "make the mind inclined to think one thing rather than another." Disagreeing with Seneca the Younger that emotion destroys reason, the 18th century Scottish philosopher George Campbell argued, instead, that emotions were allies of reason, and that they aid in the assimilation of knowledge. However, Campbell warned of the malleability of emotion and the consequent risk in terms of suggestibility:

[Emotions] are not supplanters of reason, or even rivals in her sway; they are her handmaids, by whose ministry she is enabled to usher truth into the heart, and procure it to favorable reception. As handmaids, they are liable to be seduced by sophistry in the garb of reason, and sometimes are made ignorantly to lend their aid in the introduction of falsehood.

Propaganda theorist Edward Bernays asserted confidently that "in certain cases we can effect some change in public opinion with a fair degree of accuracy by operating a certain mechanism, just as a motorist can regulate the speed of his car by manipulating the flow of gasoline." Bernays advised that to change the attitudes of the masses, a propagandist should target its "impulses, habits and emotions" and make "emotional currents" work to achieve the goal.

Indeed, some contemporary authors have attributed the popularity of the most destructive political forces in modern history to the ability of their propagandists to enchant (rather than convince) publics and to oppose "the heavenly ecstasies of religious fervor" to "naked self interest" and individualism.

Similarly, Drew Westen, professor of psychology psychiatry and behavioral sciences at Emory University, using current psychiatric and psychological research to demonstrate the power of emotions in affecting political cognition and preferences, wrote that, "when reason and emotion collide, emotion invariably wins". Westen, an advisor to Democratic political campaigns, believes that evolution has equipped people to process information by emotions and that people respond to emotional cues more than to rational arguments. Accordingly, Westen believes that emotion is vital for effective persuasion and that appeals to emotion will always be more effective than appeals to reason:

A central aspect of the art of political persuasion is creating, solidifying, and activating networks that create primarily positive feelings toward your candidate or party and negative feelings toward the opponent …

You can slog it for those few millimeters of cerebral turf that process facts, figures and policy statements. Or you can … target different emotional states with messages designed to maximize their appeal.

== Modern theories ==
A social psychology theory suggests that attitudes have three components — affect, cognition and behavior. The cognitive dimension refers "to beliefs that one holds about the attitude object, and behavior has been used to describe overt actions and responses to the attitude object". Affect, meanwhile, describes "the positive and negative feelings that one holds toward an attitude object", that is, the emotional dimension of an attitude. Modern theorists have modified the tripartite theory to argue that an attitude "does not consist of these elements, but is instead a general evaluative summary of the information derived from these bases."

Political scientist George Marcus (writing with Russell Neuman and Michael Mackuen) identifies two mental systems through which reason and emotion interact in managing and processing political stimuli:

First, the disposition system "provides people with an understanding, an emotional report card, about actions that are already in their repertoire of habits." That is, the first system is that which monitors the casual processing of political information through habit, through which most of our information processing is done.

The second system, the surveillance system, "acts to scan the environment for novelty and sudden intrusion of threat." In other words, the second system monitors the environment for any signs of threat. If a threat is found, that system takes people out of habitual, casual processing and puts them in a state of alertness and receptivity to new information:

"what is interesting about this second emotional system is that the onset of increased anxiety stops ongoing activity and orients attention to the threatening appearance so that learning can take place. [...] when the system detects unexpected of threatening stimuli, however, it evokes increased anxiety, it interrupts ongoing activity, and it shifts attention away from the previous focus and toward the intrusive stimuli."

Marcus further argues that "emotional engagement will motivate people toward making more deeply reasoned decisions about politics than those who remain dispassionate". Other people have argued that "when an emotion is aroused and experienced, it can involve a number of psychological processes that can then be used as a platform for promoting and securing influence and compliance".

Regardless, it would stand to reason, then, that affecting a subject's emotional state, in conjunction with a political message, could affect that subject's attitudes.

In modern philosophy, there are two main types of appeal to emotion. One is the appeal to force (known as ad baculum), the other is the appeal to sympathy, known as ad misericordiam. These are only considered fallacies when used for doxastic systems.

== Research ==
Accepted wisdom is that, "[w]hen it comes to issues of emotional importance, convincing someone to change his or her existing beliefs appears to be a virtually hopeless undertaking." And yet, manipulating emotions may help change attitudes:

"[t]he use of emotions to instill beliefs is prevalent in political propaganda. Depicting individuals, groups, or issues from an emotional perspective, or as actors in emotional events, evokes emotion. It thereby slips the belief that the emotion is about into the listener's mind. Presumably, it slips the beliefs into the listener's mind more easily, smoothly and unquestioned than would happen when the information alone was transmitted."

Though it is still an underdeveloped topic of research, a number of scholars are demonstrating that manipulating emotions concerning a persuasive message does affect that message's effectiveness. It has been shown, for example, that people tend to adjust their beliefs to conform with their emotions, since feelings are treated by people as evidence, and when feelings match beliefs, that is considered as validation of the beliefs. Other research shows that "emotional stimuli can influence judgment without a judge's awareness of having seen or felt anything (e.g., Bargh, 1997; Murphy & Zajonc, 1993)."

Indeed, "recent studies have confirmed that affect does play a general role in attitude change, whether due to persuasive communication, or to cognitive dissonance processes (Petty et al., 2001)".

Psychologists Petty & Cacioppo found that there are two ways of processing persuasive messages: (1) to emphasize the content and quality of the message (central processing), or (2) to emphasize instead external cues (such as the source of the message) and to disregard its content (peripheral processing). "When participants use the central/systematic route of responding to message content, they tend to be persuaded more by strong arguments, and less by weak arguments. However, the strength of the argument matters less when the peripheral route is chosen. In that case, other "peripheral" factors, such as the credibility of the source of the message or the intention of the communicator become important in the persuasive process." Petty and Cacioppo suggest that negative affect should result in more central processing and positive affect to more peripheral processing. That is, "In happy moods, people tend to be persuaded equally by strong and weak arguments, whereas in sad moods, people are persuaded only by strong arguments and reject weak arguments." Said otherwise, positive moods encourage easy acceptance of arguments, while negative moods encourage the changing of beliefs due to significant data.

Referring to the work of Marcus, political scientist Tom Brader says that, "by appealing to specific emotions, [communicators] can change the way citizens respond to political messages".

== Influence of emotion on persuasion ==
=== Negative emotions ===
==== Fear and anxiety ====
The only widely studied emotion, with respect to persuasion, is fear. Fear has been found to force individuals "to break from routine and pay close attention to the external world," including persuasive messages. Moreover, fear has been found to encourage political engagement:

"people are demonstrably more likely to engage in the political realm when they are anxious about the candidates. Uneasiness about the available political choices leads people to pay closer attention to the political environment. [...] people learn more about the candidates (that is they acquire new and accurate knowledge) when they are anxious but not when they are enthusiastic about those candidates who dominate the political field."

More generally, "fear is associated with both attitude and behavior change." However, "four variables that may interact to influence processing depth of a fear-inducing message: (a) type of fear (chronic vs. acute), (b) expectation of a message containing reassuring information, (c) type of behavior advocated (e.g., disease detection vs. health promotion), and (d) issue familiarity."

==== Guilt ====
Guilt is the emotion that is experienced when an individual violates an internalized moral, ethical or religious belief. Guilt's effect on persuasion has been studied only cursorily. Not unlike fear appeals, the literature suggests that guilt can enhance attainment of persuasive goals if evoked to a moderate degree. However, messages designed to evoke excessive levels of guilt may instead arouse anger that may impede persuasive success.

==== Anger ====
Anger's effect on persuasion has also seldom been studied. A couple of studies, however, "suggest that a positive relationship exists between anger and attitude change". Specifically, researchers found that "anger evoked in response to issues of juvenile crime and domestic terrorism correlated with acceptance of legislative initiatives proposed to address those issues". Not unlike fear, anger was associated with close (central) information processing including of persuasive messages. However, "unintentionally induced anger in response to supposed guilt and fear appeals has been shown to correlate negatively with attitudes". The persuasive uses of anger have also been studied in political campaigns, since anger can be evoked strategically by politicians to increase the motivation and engagement of their sympathizers, although the historian Nicole Hemmer has noted that the potential for an American candidate to use anger effectively is contingent on their identity.

==== Sadness ====
Sadness arousal has been associated with attitude change in the context of AIDS, illicit drugs, and juvenile crime.

==== Disgust ====
Disgust, in the context of messages opposing animal experimentation, is correlated negatively with attitude change. This is consistent with the idea that disgust results in a rejection of its source.

=== Positive emotions ===
==== Empathy and compassion ====
A number of recent studies support the role of compassion in skewing moral judgment. The researchers' findings show there is a major relationship between moral judgment and empathic concern in particular, specifically feelings of warmth and compassion in response to someone in distress.

Images of suffering children are considered to be the ideal triggers of this instinctive compassion.

Once triggered, compassion causes individuals to favor the few they see suffering over the many who they know to be suffering but in the abstract: "People who feel similar to another person in need have been shown to experience more empathic compassion for that person than do those not manipulated to feel similar to another."

Dan Ariely notes that appeals that, through visual cues or otherwise, make us focus on specific, individual victims affect our attitudes and cause us to take action whereas, "when many people are involved, we don't. A cold calculation does not increase our concern for large problems; instead, it suppresses our compassion."

"In many ways, it is very sad that the only effective way to get people to respond to suffering is through an emotional appeal, rather than through an objective reading of massive need. The upside is that when our emotions are awakened, we can be tremendously caring. Once we attach an individual face to suffering, we're much more willing to help, and we go far beyond what economists would expect from rational, selfish, maximizing agents." Empathy also influences our prosocial behaviors. Prosocial behaviors are actions that are concerned with helping others. For example, people are much more likely to donate money to find a cure for a disease when they know someone personally who has that illness. The empathy and compassion that we feel towards that person is what encourages us to donate. An empathy study was conducted by Fowler, Law, and Gaesser. The goal of this study was to determine how the empathy we feel varies throughout different people in our lives. Participants were asked to make a list of one hundred people. The people at the top of the list were parents, family, loved ones, etc. Towards the bottom of the list were strangers. Participants were then asked to imagine these people in various scenarios and describe the degree of empathy that they had towards each person. Results showed that the closer a person was the more empathy they felt, and for those at the bottom of the list there was not much empathy felt in comparison.

==== Pride ====
"Little studied in the social influence context, the one clearly identifiable study of pride and persuasion considered the role of culture in response to advertising, finding that members of a collectivist culture (China) responded more favorably to a pride-based appeal, whereas members of an individualist culture (the United States) responded more favorably to an empathy-based appeal."

==== Relief ====
Some researchers have argued that anxiety which is followed by relief results in greater compliance to a request than fear, because the relief causes a temporary state of disorientation, leaving individuals vulnerable to suggestion. The suggestion is that relief-based persuasion is a function of less careful information processing.

==== Hope ====
Experiments have shown that appeals to hope are successful mainly with subjects who self-report as being predisposed to experiencing fear. While hope is often seen and understood as an abstract concept, Adrienne Martin proves otherwise in their book How We Hope. In this book it is explained how hope is a two-part emotion. First, we feel hope, then we experience it. For example, when we have a desired goal, we hope that we can reach it, but that hope is what motivates us as individuals to work towards that goal. Hope also changes how we perceive others. Martin explains how once we can relate to someone, we are then feeling some degree of hope for them: hope for success, change or growth.

== Examples ==
- Think of the children
- Checkers speech
- Reductio ad Hitlerum

== See also ==
- Bread and circuses
- Fake news
- Post-truth politics
- Argumentum ad lazarum
