= Cut and run (disambiguation) =

Cut and run is a phrase meaning to "hurry off" typically used pejoratively in politics in reference to withdrawing troops from a conflict.

Cut and run may also refer to:

- Cut and Run (film), a 1985 Italian film
- CUT&RUN (biology), a molecular biology technique
- Banksy: Cut and Run, a 2023 exhibition by the artist Banksy at the Gallery of Modern Art, Glasgow
- "Cut and Run" (Star Wars: The Bad Batch)
