= A Play of Giants =

1984 play by Wole Soyinka

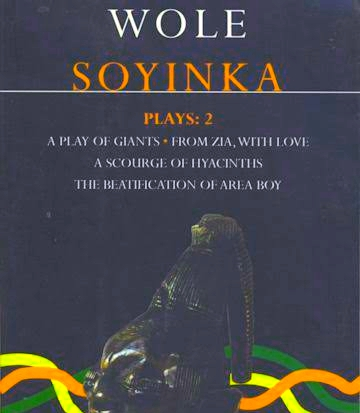
- A Play Of Giants
- Author: Wole Soyinka
- Language: English
- Genre: fiction
- Publisher: Methuen
- Publication date: January 1, 1984
- Publication place: Africa
- Pages: 69
- ISBN: 0-413-55290-X

A Play of Giants is a play by Wole Soyinka, Africa's first Nobel Prize winner in 1986. The play is a satire that takes aim at dictators in Africa, including the notorious Idi Amin. Set at the New York embassy, the play ingeniously portrays a gathering of dictatorial African leaders, highlighting their absurdities and follies as they attempt to navigate cooperation and decision-making. Through sharp wit and clever dialogue, the play offers a scathing commentary on power, politics, and the human condition, inviting audiences to reflect on the nature of tyranny and its impact on society. It was published on January 1, 1984.

== Plot ==
The play is set at the Bulgara Embassy in New York City, adorned with decorations and displays of wealth. In the center stands a sculptor, attempting to capture the likeness of African tyrants. Enter Gunema, Kasco representing, Kamini, and Tuboum, with each representing a country as listed respectively Equatorial Guinea, Central African Republic, Uganda, Congo/Zaïre, accompanied by their entourage of sycophants and advisors. They exude an air of arrogance and self-importance as they survey the scene.

Kamini, one of the main cast of the play (charismatic host), takes center stage, regaling the others with his grandiose tales of conquest and power. Despite his charm, there is an underlying sense of unease among the group, as they constantly fret over the stability of their regimes back home. As the sculptor struggles to immortalize the tyrants in stone, they offer unsolicited advice and criticism, revealing their vanity and insecurity. Meanwhile, their Western admirers, including the Scandinavian journalist Gudrun and professor Batey, fawn over them with feigned admiration.

The absurdity reaches new heights as the African leaders grapple with their own delusions of grandeur. Gunema attempts to solve his country's financial woes by simply printing more money, while Kasco declares himself above politics, embracing absolute power as emperor. Amidst the chaos, Kamini emerges as the central figure, his erratic behavior keeping everyone on edge. Despite his bluster, he is haunted by the specter of betrayal, as his once-loyal followers begin to defect in the face of his tyranny. Meanwhile, representatives of the US and USSR make an appearance, their indifference to African suffering highlighting the cynical geopolitics of the Cold War era. As the play reaches its climax, the façade of power begins to crumble. Kamini, desperate to maintain control, resorts to increasingly brutal tactics, alienating even those who once supported him. In a moment of rare engagement, Kasco reflects on the nature of power and politics, questioning whether his fellow tyrants are truly free or merely trapped by their own ambitions.

== Characters ==
- Benefacio Gunema, inspired by Macias Nguema, a character that constantly seeks validation and adulation, but underneath his bravado lies a deep insecurity as he struggles to control his failing regime. Gunema's tendency to resort to extreme measures to silence dissent only isolates him further. Despite his flaws, there's a tragic aspect to Gunema, haunted by his past atrocities and consumed by his own insecurities.
- Emperor Kasco, modeled after Jean-Bedel Bokassa, embodies relentless pursuit of absolute power. He exudes regal authority, relishing in the symbols of his self-proclaimed empire. Kasco views himself as beyond the mundane concerns of politics, believing himself to be a divine ruler chosen by fate. Despite his outward confidence, he harbors deep-seated paranoia, constantly purging perceived threats to his reign. Kasco's methods include brutal repression and manipulation, reflecting his willingness to do whatever it takes to maintain control. However, beneath his facade of strength lies a fragile ego, easily wounded by dissent.
- Field-Marshal Kamini, inspired by Idi Amin, is a charismatic yet brutal leader. Known for his charm and cruelty, he effortlessly commands loyalty while manipulating the fears of his subordinates. Despite projecting strength, Kamini is deeply insecure and paranoid, ruling through fear and violence to maintain power. Beneath his facade lies a troubled soul haunted by past atrocities.
- General Barra Tuboum, inspired by Mobutu Sese Seko, a cunning and ruthless character. He commands respect through quiet authority, always staying ahead of his adversaries with masterful strategy. Tuboum is a pragmatic realist, unhampered by moral concerns, viewing power as the ultimate goal. He is willing to betray allies and sacrifice anything to satisfy his ambition for power. Despite his calm exterior, Tuboum harbors an insatiable thirst for dominance.
