= Appeal to flattery =

Emotion based fallacy

Appeal to flattery is a fallacy in which a person uses flattery, excessive compliments, in an attempt to appeal to their audience's vanity to win support for their side. It is also known as apple polishing, wheel greasing, brown nosing, appeal to pride, appeal to vanity or argumentum ad superbiam. The appeal to flattery is a specific kind of appeal to emotion.

Flattery is often used to hide the true intent of an idea or proposal. Praise offers a momentary personal distraction that can often weaken judgment. Moreover, it is usually a cunning form of appeal to consequences, since the audience is subject to be flattered as long as they comply with the flatterer.

Examples:

"Surely a man as smart as you can see this is a brilliant proposal." (failing to accept the proposal is a tacit admission of stupidity)
"Is there a strong man here who could carry this for me?" (a failure to demonstrate physical strength implies weakness)

A refusal which does not deny the compliment could be formulated thus: "I may be [positive attribute], but that doesn't mean that I will [perform action] for you."

It is not necessarily a logical fallacy, however, when the compliment is sincere, and directly related to the argument. Example:

"You are a stunningly beautiful girl – you should become a model."

== See also ==
- Flattery
- Superficial charm
- Sycophancy
- Pollyanna principle
