= Kolakeia =

Greek word

Kolakeia (from the Greek κολακεία, meaning flattery) is the act of flattering someone as a means to take advantage of or gain something from them through speech. It overloads a person with compliments so the speaker can slip in another idea that the listener may not agree upon. It may also include a subtle compliment where the listener does not know it happened but it affects their way of thinking. The use of the kolakeia is often looked down upon because it is not a true concept of speech. The use of this type of communication, allows people to question the speaker's motives.

An example of kolakeia in action is Medea's answer when the choir's sympathy asks about the banishment from Creon. She simply answers, "Do you think I would ever flatter this man unless I was scheming or bound to profit in some way?" Medea's flattery towards the king allows her to ruin her enemies, and the harm placed on the enemy is hidden through flattery.
