= Not in Front of the Children =

Book by Marjorie Heins

- Book jacket
- Author: Marjorie Heins
- Original title: Not in Front of the Children: "Indecency," Censorship, and the Innocence of Youth
- Language: English
- Subject: Freedom of speech
- Published: Hill & Wang
- Publication date: May 2001
- Publication place: United States
- Media type: Hardcover
- Pages: 402
- Awards: Eli M. Oboler Award (2002)
- ISBN: 978-0-374-17545-0
- OCLC: 45080058
- LC Class: 00047274

Not in Front of the Children: "Indecency," Censorship, and the Innocence of Youth is a non-fiction book by attorney and civil libertarian Marjorie Heins about freedom of speech and the relationship between censorship and the "think of the children" argument. The book presents a chronological history of censorship from Ancient Greece, Ancient Rome and the Middle Ages to the present. It discusses notable censored works, including Ulysses by James Joyce, Lady Chatterley's Lover by D. H. Lawrence and the seven dirty words monologue by comedian George Carlin. Heins discusses censorship aimed at youth in the United States through legislation including the Children's Internet Protection Act and the Communications Decency Act.

The author explores the question of whether children and adolescents are negatively impacted by exposure to media deemed inappropriate by adults (including violence and pornography), arguing that youths are not endangered by sexually explicit material. Heins asserts that there is no simple tactic by which the government can censor material from children without violating rights guaranteed to adults by the First Amendment to the United States Constitution. She points out that although the view of sexually explicit material's negative impact on children is unproven, the fear of its impact is used to support morality-based arguments; appeals to morality should not be a basis for censorship. Not in Front of the Children concludes that censorship under the auspices of protecting youth actually has the unintended consequence of harming them.

Not in Front of the Children received the Eli M. Oboler Award in 2002 from the American Library Association as the "Best Published Work on Intellectual Freedom". Booklist recommended it as a starting point for discussion between adolescents and adults. Library Journal recommended the book for academic and public libraries as a detailed history of censorship related to obscenity. Publishers Weekly called the book a significant work in the fields of child psychology and civil liberties. In Florida, the St. Petersburg Times praised the book as an engaging look at attempts to prevent adolescents from thinking about sexuality. The American Prospect criticized Heins' presentation style, calling the book boring.

== Background ==
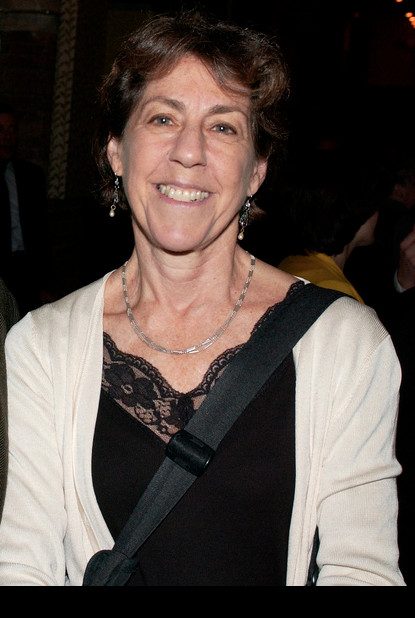
Marjorie Heins at an event for the National Coalition Against Censorship in 2009

Author Marjorie Heins, an attorney with a focus on civil liberties, received a Bachelor of Arts degree from Cornell University in 1967. She graduated magna cum laude from Harvard Law School, receiving a juris doctor degree in 1978. At the time of the book's publication, Heins was director of the Free Expression Policy Project at the National Coalition Against Censorship.

Her prior published books include Strictly Ghetto Property: The Story of Los Siete de la Raza (1972), Cutting the Mustard: Affirmative Action and the Nature of Excellence (1987) and Sex, Sin, and Blasphemy: A Guide to America's Censorship Wars (1993). After Not in Front of the Children was published, Heins wrote Priests of Our Democracy: The Supreme Court, Academic Freedom, and the Anti-Communist Purge (which received the Hugh M. Hefner First Amendment Award) in 2013.

Before publication the book's working title was Not in Front of the Children: "Indecency" in History, Politics, and Law, and it was first published in 2001 by Hill & Wang. Heins' original book included about 300 pages of material, with an additional-notes section over 100 pages long. A paperback edition from the same publisher was released in 2002, and Rutgers University Press published paperback and e-book editions in 2007. The 2007 paperback edition included a new introduction to the book by Heins. A European edition was published in 2008. Heins dedicated the book to her Harvard Law School professor Benjamin Kaplan.

== Content summary ==
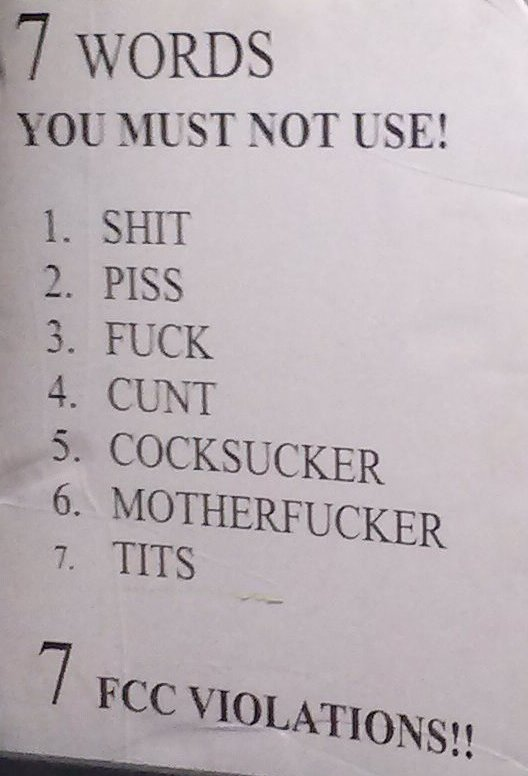
Not in Front of the Children places George Carlin's seven dirty words monologue within the context of censorship history.

Not in Front of the Children is a history of censorship from Ancient Greece, Ancient Rome and the Middle Ages to the present. Heins examines the Comstock laws, promulgated by Anthony Comstock in 1873, which criminalized the mailing of writings deemed immoral. Examples of censored works include James Joyce's Ulysses, D. H. Lawrence's Lady Chatterley's Lover and comedian George Carlin's seven dirty words monologue. The author discusses the Meese Report, by the Attorney General's Commission on Pornography. The report acquired its colloquial name because the panel was selected by U.S. Attorney General Edwin Meese. Released in 1986, the report decried pornography's alleged harm to women and children. Contemporary censorship issues detailed in the book include Howard Stern and the Columbine High School massacre, and the author critiques A Return to Modesty: Discovering the Lost Virtue by Wendy Shalit and Mothers Organized for Moral Stability (MOMS). The author discusses censorship aimed at youth in U.S. legislation including the Children's Internet Protection Act and Communications Decency Act.

Heins examines the question of whether children and adolescents are negatively impacted by exposure to violence and pornography, contending that youth are not endangered by sexually explicit material. She believes that censorship of such material from adolescents is based on the idea that minors are innocent and exposure to inappropriate media would corrupt them, explaining how this belief has been used as a basis for censorship. Heins explores whether the government or parents should restrict children's access to potentially inappropriate material, believing that the decision should rest primarily with parents. She writes that there is no simple tactic by which government can censor material from children without violating First-Amendment rights guaranteed to adults. Heins warns that attempting to categorize forms of creative expression in order to prohibit particular works of art results in censorship choices which reflect an ideological point-of-view.

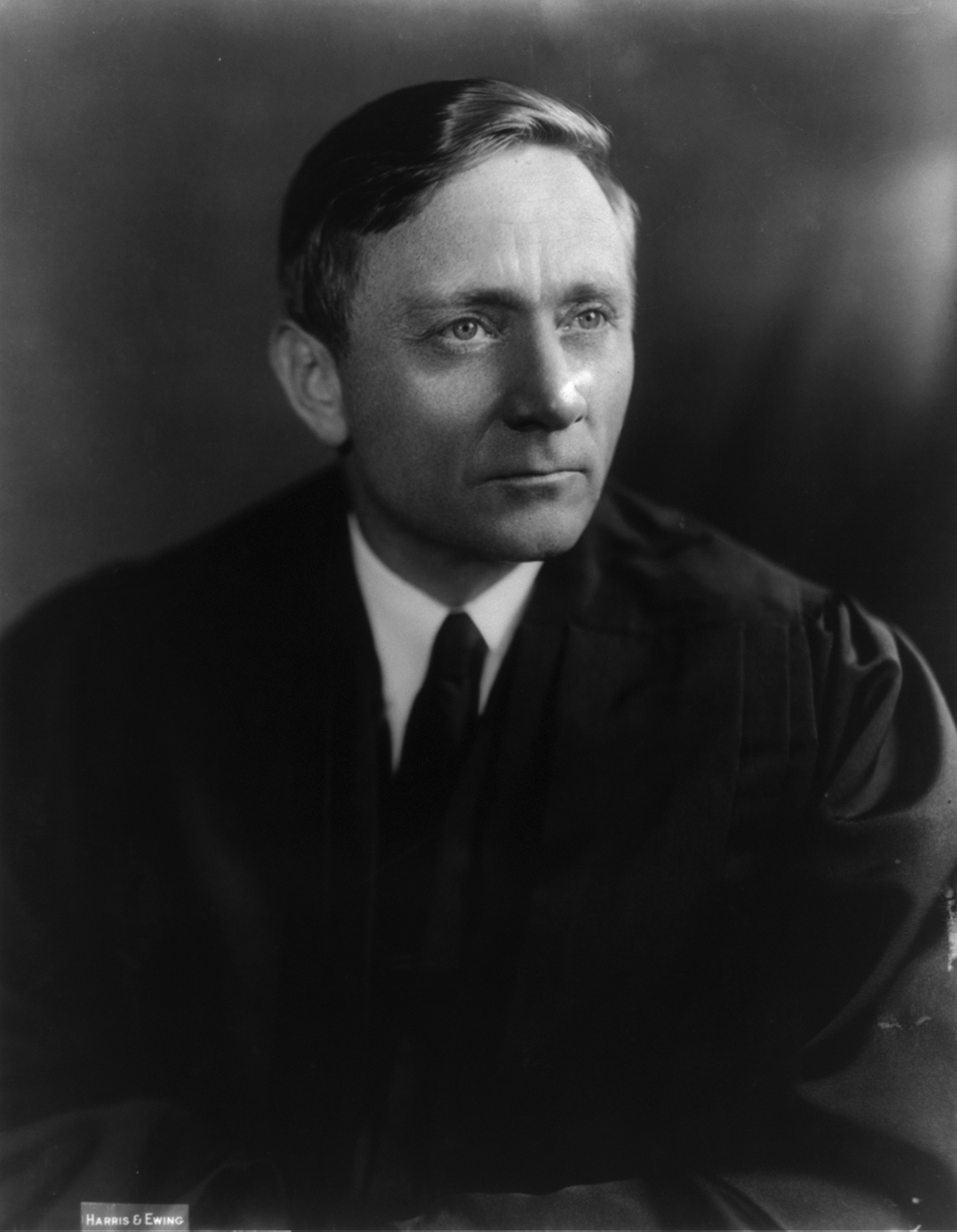
U.S. Supreme Court Justice William O. Douglas wrote a dissenting opinion in Ginsberg v. New York.

The author believes that determinations of what should be censored from whom should not be made by the government, stressing that a society must ensure that there is a tangible negative impact on youth from certain material before imposing censorship. She writes that it becomes incredibly difficult to characterize specifically what should and should not be censored, resulting in negative overreaching consequences of censorship. Heins advises the impact on society from censorship could be so great that censors should be sure there is real actual harm rather than imagined harm prior to enacting restrictive laws regulating indecency or the Internet.

Not in Front of the Children explores the development of U.S. case law with different standards of censorship for children and adults. The author describes a 1968 Supreme Court of the United States case, Ginsberg v. New York, where the court upheld a law preventing minors from viewing sexually explicit media. Sam Ginsberg and his wife managed a diner in Bellmore, New York. A mother sent her 16-year-old son to buy two adult magazines at the diner, creating a situation where Ginsberg would be prosecuted. Ginsberg was convicted of violating a New York State law which forbade selling magazines with pictures of nude women to minors.

The U.S. Supreme Court upheld Ginsberg's conviction, ruling that the New York State Legislature was not required to prove a tangible negative impact on youth from exposure to sexually explicit material. The Court said the New York State Legislature only needed to assume that such an impact existed. Justice William O. Douglas wrote a dissenting opinion in the case, criticizing the New York law. He concluded he knew individuals who fit the definition of juvenile delinquent but were fifty years old, and extrapolated the impact of the decision could be expanded to affect adults and multiple organizations in society instead of just youths.

Heins demonstrates how lawmakers in other states used the Ginsberg v. New York ruling to increase morality-based censorship of material from children. A year after the ruling, an Ohio court determined that Ken Kesey's novel One Flew Over the Cuckoo's Nest was inappropriate for youth. The author explains the dangers in allowing the government to determine appropriate material for youth to view, pointing out that the belief in sexually explicit material's negative impact on children is unproven. Heins notes that the fear of this impact is used to support morality-based arguments, and appeals to morality should not be a basis for censorship. Not in Front of the Children concludes that censorship under the auspices of protecting youth actually harms them through the censorship itself.

== Themes ==
Scholars have discussed Not in Front of the Children in academic journal articles, and characterized it as a work which balances education policy against the negative consequences of censorship. In an article for Journal of Sex & Marital Therapy, Middlebury College women's studies professor Deborah Grant compared the book to Harmful to Minors by Judith Levine. Grant characterized both books as significant works emphasizing the importance of allowing youths access to informative educational resources. She classed Heins' monograph as a thorough and important survey of the chronology of censorship. Perry L. Glanzer wrote in English Journal that Heins had a valid viewpoint to engage students on controversial topics in literature classes, and he added it was necessary to teach them all perspectives of a debate. Ellen P. Goodman wrote for Berkeley Technology Law Journal that Heins was critical of prior articles which attempted to show negative impact from violence as portrayed on television programs.

Writing in the journal Social Problems, Jessica Fields characterized Not in Front of the Children as a significant monograph which effectively criticized the rhetoric of protection of the sexual purity of youths as a form of ideology. Cynthia A. McDaniel wrote in a piece for the journal Counterpoints assessing that Heins had put forth a thesis that attempting to shield youths from events led to negative unintended consequences. McDaniel emphasized that rationale debate is key to a functional society which values freedom of choice. She wrote that debate and introspection were critical to growth in this area, in order to determine the need to modify behavior patterns.

Journal The Library Quarterly published an article by Eliza T. Dresang which classed Not in Front of the Children as an effective treatise on the harmful to minors doctrine. Dresang wrote that Heins had successfully shown that this doctrine, which served as the core basis for legislation including the Children's Internet Protection Act (CIPA), was demonstrably impossible to prove. She concluded that Heins concisely argued censorship of works from the reach of children can have negative impacts on their level of innovation, healthy mental growth, and adaptive abilities. Writing in English Journal, Tonya Perry discussed the work and emphasized that if the motivation behind children's education was to produce independent critical thinkers, it was necessary to extend the limits of censorship.

David Darts discussed Not in Front of the Children in an article for Studies in Art Education, and wrote that queries over artistic value as balanced against a desire to protect attendees of educational institutions from perceived harm repeatedly came up over time in the history of censorship. He observed that the rationale for justifying censorship of artwork from children was based upon similar reasons dating back from Plato to contemporary times, namely anxiety that youth would become corrupted by viewing products deemed inappropriate.

== Reception ==
Not in Front of the Children received the 2002 Eli M. Oboler Award from the American Library Association. It was recognized as the "best published work" on the subject of intellectual freedom. Booklist called it an in-depth analysis of a hotly debated topic. Analyzing the book's appropriateness for young adults, Booklist concluded there was a great deal in the work to stimulate discussion between adults and adolescents.

Publishers Weekly reviewed the book favorably, and questioned whether Edward Lear would have been surprised to find his 1867 poem "The Owl and the Pussycat" had been censored from school library computer access due to online filters restricting users from reading anything containing the word "pussy". The review wrote that Heins powerfully argued that the notion of safeguarding youths from potential corruption had gone too far in the United States. Publishers Weekly concluded the author's thesis was a key work within the fields of both child psychology and civil liberties.

In its review, the Library Journal said the work by Heins reflected a thorough investigation of the subject matter and presented a good overview of the chronology of censorship. The review concluded the author's thesis that censorship under the guise of helping children caused more harm than good was a sound one. Library Journal recommended the book both for academic libraries as well as public libraries, and called a lecture by the author on her book "a must". School Library Journal wrote that the book was timely due to the fact that there were significant issues of censorship being reported. School Library Journal praised Heins for her high level of studious effort preparing the work, and recommended it for all those involved in issues surrounding freedom of expression. The journal said academia had been waiting for such a valuable resource for a significant period of time. The review concluded it was quite impressive that Heins kept to an objective viewpoint throughout discussions of censorship in her monograph.

The St. Petersburg Times called the book an in-depth analysis of American anxiety over restricting sexual feelings of children. The Hollywood Reporter noted that Heins made an important distinction in arguing that taboo topics should be taught to children by their parents, and it should not be the role of government to censor what material individuals are allowed to view (or speak). The Atlanta Journal-Constitution recommended Heins' study for summer nonfiction reading in its "Family Matters" section.

In The New York Times, journalist Michael Massing felt that the author's view on contemporary free-speech issues (her stance on limiting censorship, and her view that little television programming could cause harm to children) was extreme. The American Prospect criticized the author's presentation style, acknowledging Heins was a skilled attorney on the subject of civil liberties, but called the book itself boring. The review compared the author's writing style to comic books, and concluded Heins' chronology of litigation regarding profane speech came across as less than a neutral presentation.

== See also ==
- Ashcroft v. American Civil Liberties Union
- Brown v. Entertainment Merchants Association
- Censorship in the United States
- Cohen v. California
- Freedom of speech in the United States
- Freedom of the press
- Harmful to Minors
- Island Trees School District v. Pico
- Freedom of speech in schools in the United States
- Think of the children
- Tinker v. Des Moines Independent Community School District
