= SafeToNet =

British cyber safety company

- Logo as of 2024
- Type: Private limited company
- Industry: Software
- Genre: Cyber safety
- Founded: 2013; 13 years ago
- Founder: Richard Pursey; Sharon Pursey; Jack Pursey; Ted Hailey
- Headquarters: 1st Floor, 5–11 Lavington St, London SE1 0NZ, London, England
- Number of locations: 3
- Area served: Worldwide
- Key people: Richard Pursey, CEO; Sharon Pursey, Head of Strategic Alliances
- Products: SafeToNet (MDM, AI, ICBS)
- Number of employees: 50
- Website: safetonet.com

SafeToNet is a British cyber-security company headquartered in London, with offices in Cologne and Toronto. The company uses artificial intelligence (AI) and behavioural analytics to help safeguard children by detecting threats such as cyberbullying, sextortion, abuse and aggression.

== History ==
SafeToNet was founded by Richard Pursey, Sharon Pursey, Georgina Pursey, Jack Pursey and Ted Hailey in October 2013, and its products were first launched in July 2017.

In February 2016 the company, then based in Reading, secured £3 million in capital and resources from DuKlaw Ventures, a Swiss investment firm. A subscription service was previewed at Mobile World Congress in February 2018 ahead of a United Kingdom launch that April, following beta testing with around 5,000 users during 2017. The company had by then raised just under £9 million from undisclosed private investors, and set pricing at £4.99 per month per household or £50 paid annually.

In June 2018, SafeToNet acquired AI startup VISR, and raised $13 million in Series A private placement led by London-based venture capital firm, West Hill Capital.

In March 2020 the company released an analysis of more than 65 million messages typed since the previous November by some 50,000 children using its application. It reported that girls aged 10 accounted for the largest share of the most explicit sexual language – a result it said it had not anticipated – and that coded vocabulary borrowed from the menu of the restaurant chain Nando's was being used to disguise sexual references. Pursey characterised the behaviour as a rite of passage rather than an indicator of sexual activity.

In December 2020, SafeToNet acquired Content Watch Holdings, the United States owner of the parental control software Net Nanny. Financial terms were not disclosed. The company presented the purchase as preparation for a Series B funding round planned for early 2021, and said combining the two products would allow its software to block an application, disable a camera, or lock a handset when it identified an immediate risk to a child.

According to the Financial Times, the company has had contact with British ministers since at least 2020, when the then Culture Secretary Oliver Dowden visited SafeToNet and afterwards told the House of Commons that he had seen device-level blocking of explicit images demonstrated. In the same year the then Home Secretary Priti Patel requested advice for ministers on promoting the company's software. In August 2026 the actor Drew Barrymore, who had previously collaborated with HMD, was appointed a director of SafeToNet; the politician Rupert Lowe is a shareholder.

== HarmBlock ==
HarmBlock is an artificial intelligence tool developed by SafeToNet that blocks nudity and sexually explicit material. HMD announced that HarmBlock+ included for HMD Fuse, a mobile phone designed for children.

== HMD Fuse ==
The HMD Fuse, announced on 20 August 2025, was the first handset to incorporate HarmBlock. Its safety layer, marketed as HarmBlock+, combined SafeToNet's classifier with a parental control service supplied by Xplora and HMD's handset and operating system. Xplora's component allowed a parent to pair their own device with the handset to manage applications and screen time, track location at 24-second intervals, and set geographic alerts.

HMD said the device followed a co-design exercise consulting more than 37,000 parents, guardians and children. It ships with smartphone functions disabled, operating as a basic handset limited to calls, messages and location tracking until a parent enables further features. Pursey described the result as "pornography incompatible". The Internet Watch Foundation's chief technology officer welcomed the approach of building safeguards into devices.

The handset has a 6.56-inch HD+ display with a 90 Hz refresh rate, a Snapdragon 4 Gen 2 processor, 6 GB of memory and 128 GB of expandable storage, a 108-megapixel rear camera, a 50-megapixel front camera and a 5,000 mAh battery, and runs Android 15. It was sold in the United Kingdom through Vodafone and Three at £30 upfront and £33 per month, and in Australia for A$799 including a year's subscription. The handset has a 6.56-inch HD+ display with a 90 Hz refresh rate, a Snapdragon 4 Gen 2 processor, 6 GB of memory and 128 GB of expandable storage, a 108-megapixel rear camera, a 50-megapixel front camera and a 5,000 mAh battery, and runs Android 15. It was sold in the United Kingdom through Vodafone and Three at £30 upfront and £33 per month, and in Australia for A$799 including a year's subscription.

In July 2026, the independent security consultant Paul Moore reported that pairing between a parent's device and a handset relied on the IMEI number, which was partly predictable, so that an unauthorised person could potentially register as the guardian of another child's device and view its live location. HMD took the service offline on 9 July, notified the Information Commissioner's Office and restored access for existing users on 22 July after Xplora deployed fixes, saying it had found no evidence of exploitation by anyone other than Moore. HMD attributed the flaw to Xplora's parental control service rather than to HarmBlock, and Moore said his findings did not indicate a weakness in SafeToNet's classifier, though he questioned the due diligence carried out before the device was endorsed. HMD and Vodafone paused sales pending a permanent fix.

== Awards and recognition ==
=== Awards ===
- November 2016 - Pride of Reading's "Entrepreneur of the Year" to co-founder and CEO Richard Pursey
- November 2016 - Winner of KPMG's "Best British Mobile Start-Up" competition for South West England
- November 2016 - SafeToNet wins BT Infinity Lab 'mobile innovation' competition
- March 2017 - Winner of KPMG’s "Best British Mobile Start-Up" competition at Mobile World Congress in Barcelona
- September 2017 - GoIgnite Global Call's "Consumer Experience AI" award
- October 2017 - "Rising Star Award" by Women in Business to Co-founder Sharon for her work with SafeToNet
- November 2017 - Thames Valley Business Magazine Awards for "Best Use of Technology"

=== Recognition ===
- March 2017 - Featured in RealBusiness publication's "The 50 most disruptive UK companies in 2017: The Future 50"
- June 2017 - Featured in Businesscloud UK's "101 tech start-up disrupter's list" for 2017
- Recognised by Cisco as one of the UK and Ireland's top 50 cyber security start-ups (the Cisco50 programme)

== Relationship between the SafeToNet Foundation and SafeToNet Ltd. ==
SafeToNet Foundation is a registered UK charity, SafeToNet Ltd is a commercial enterprise and funds the SafeToNet Foundation. Both are concerned with safeguarding children in the Digital Context. While SafeToNet does this using technology and applications, the SafeToNet Foundation does this through education, information, finding projects and research. The SafeToNet Foundation also works with subject matter experts to rehabilitate any victims of cyber abuse.
