= Appeal to pity =

Type of logical fallacy

An appeal to pity (also called argumentum ad misericordiam) is a fallacy in which someone improperly appeals to pity or similar feelings like empathy, as a method of persuading someone to agree with a conclusion. It is a specific kind of appeal to emotion. This fallacy can happen in two ways: 1) when an appeal to pity (or a similar emotion) has nothing to do with the actual point of the argument, or 2) when the emotional appeal is exaggerated or excessive compared to the situation being discussed. Not all appeals to pity are logical fallacies. When the feelings of pity are directly related to the conclusion and help support the argument logically, they can be reasonable, such as appealing to pity when asking for help.

== Examples ==
- "You must have graded my exam incorrectly. I studied very hard for weeks specifically because I knew my career depended on getting a good grade. If you give me a failing grade, I'm ruined!"
- "Ladies and gentlemen of the jury, look at this miserable man, in a wheelchair, unable to use his legs. Could such a man really be guilty of embezzlement?"

== See also ==
- Appeal to consequences
- Ad hominem
- Think of the children
- Guilt tripping
