= National Coalition Against Censorship =

American alliance of non-profit organizations

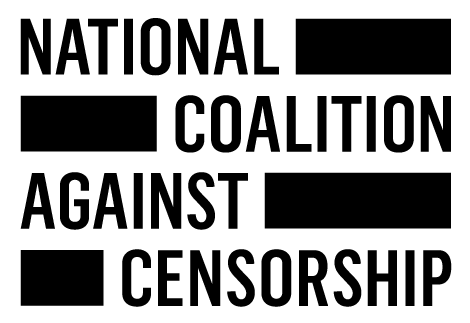
- Formation: 1974; 52 years ago
- Tax ID no.: 13-3197949
- Legal status: 501(c)(3)
- Location: New York
- Revenue: $1,190,255 (2017)
- Website: https://ncac.org/

The National Coalition Against Censorship (NCAC), founded in 1974, is an alliance of 50 American non-profit organizations, including literary, artistic, religious, educational, professional, labor, and civil liberties groups. NCAC is a New York–based organization with official 501(c)(3) status in the United States. The coalition seeks to defend freedom of thought, inquiry, and expression from censorship and threats of censorship through education and outreach, and direct advocacy. NCAC assists individuals, community groups, and institutions with strategies and resources for resisting censorship and creating a climate hospitable to free expression. It also encourages the publicizing of cases of censorship and has a place to report instances of censorship on the organization's website. Their annual fundraiser is called the Free Speech Defender Awards. The main goal of the organization is to defend the first amendment, freedom of thought, inquiry, and expression. NCAC's website contains reports of censorship incidents, analysis and discussion of free expression issues, a database of legal cases in the arts, an archive of NCAC's quarterly newsletter, a blog, and Censorpedia, a crowdsourced wiki. In fiscal year 2017, the organization earned a 95.93% rating by Charity Navigator, an organization that assesses the efficacy of nonprofits.

== Focus ==
NCAC is concerned with censorship across all media including art, literature, and film; it works on several fronts through its programs, working with artists and curators through the Arts & Culture Advocacy Program (ACAP), addressing young people and youth culture through the Youth Free Expression Program (YFEP) and the Kids' Right to Read Project (KRRP). Past initiatives include defending researchers with The Knowledge Project: Censorship and Sciences, and addressing the rights of people of all sexual orientations through the Sex and Censorship project.

NCAC's online resources include CENSORPEDIA, a crowdsourced wiki for censorship incidents, and Artists Rights, a guide intended for artists and arts professionals containing explanations of art that is (and is not) protected by the First Amendment of the U.S. Constitution.

According to their website, their mission is to:

- Assist students, teachers, librarians, parents and others opposing censorship in schools and libraries
- Work with artists, curators and museum directors resisting art censorship
- Inform public officials, the media, and the general public about First Amendment rights and obligations
- Advocate for public policies and laws that respect First Amendment rights and principles
- Educate young people about the First Amendment and the importance of free expression
- Engage with a nationwide network of activists and support local activism
- Identify and analyze censorship trends and develop new strategies to promote free speech rights

== Beginning ==
NCAC formed "The Coalition" in 1973 in response to the Supreme Court decision in Miller v. California. The decision concluded that the First Amendment does not protect obscene speech and defined obscene as something lacking serious literary, artistic, or scientific value.

== Free Speech Defender Awards ==
The Free Speech Defender Awards is NCAC's annual fundraiser.

=== 2017 ===
The 2017 Free Speech Defender Awards took place on November 6 in downtown New York City. The event honored David Levithan and Joan E. Bertin. Levithan is a young adult author who often features gay characters in his novels. Bertin is a constitutional and civil rights lawyer who was the executive director of NCAC from 1997 until June 2017.

=== 2018 ===
On November 5, 2018, the Free Speech Defender awards took place in New York City and honored the artistic director of The Public Theater, Oscar Eustis, for his commitment to promoting public theater and defending freedom of expression. At the direction of Eustis, in 2017, The Public Theater performed a version of Shakespeare's Julius Caesar where the depiction of Julius was "Trump-like". This depiction caused two of the play's largest funders to withdraw, but Eustis did not alter the production. In defense of his play, Eustis said: "Those who attempt to defend democracy by undemocratic means pay a terrible price and destroy the very thing they are fighting to save."

The 2018 Free Speech Defender Awards featured a joint performance by theater stars, Joe Iconis and George Salazar. The two men sung a song from a musical in development called Be More Chill.

Gayle Forman, a best-selling young-adult novelist, Ny'Shira Lundy, a teenage literary activist, and Sadie Price-Elliott, a youth film maker were also honored at the event.

== Coalition members ==
According to the NCAC's official website, the members of the coalition are:

- Actors' Equity Association
- AICA-USA
- American Association of School Administrators
- American Association of University Professors
- American Association of University Women
- American Booksellers for Free Expression
- American Civil Liberties Union
- American Ethical Union
- American Federation of Teachers
- American Jewish Committee
- American Library Association
- American Literary Translators Association
- American Society of Journalists & Authors
- Americans United for Separation of Church & State
- Association of American Publishers
- Authors Guild
- Catholics for Choice
- Children's Literature Association
- College Art Association
- Comic Book Legal Defense Fund
- The Creative Coalition
- Directors Guild of America
- Dramatists Guild of America
- Dramatists Legal Defense Fund
- Educational Book & Media Association
- First Amendment Lawyers Association
- Free Speech Coalition
- Global Alliance for Behavioral Health and Social Justice
- International Literacy Association
- Lambda Legal
- Modern Language Association
- National Center for Science Education
- National Communication Association
- National Council for the Social Studies
- National Council of Churches
- National Council of Jewish Women
- National Council of Teachers of English
- National Education Association
- National Youth Rights Association
- The NewsGuild-CWA
- PEN America
- People for the American Way
- PFLAG
- Planned Parenthood Federation of America
- Poets & Writers
- Project Censored
- SAG-AFTRA
- Sexuality Information & Education Council of the U.S.
- Society of Children's Book Writers & Illustrators
- Student Press Law Center
- Union for Reform Judaism
- Unitarian Universalist Association
- United Church of Christ, Office of Communication
- United Methodist Church, United Methodist Communications
- Women's American ORT
- Woodhull Freedom Foundation
- Writers Guild of America, East
- Writers Guild of America, West

== See also ==
- Cutting the Mustard: Affirmative Action and the Nature of Excellence
- Free Expression Policy Project
- Not in Front of the Children: "Indecency," Censorship, and the Innocence of Youth
- Sex, Sin, and Blasphemy: A Guide to America's Censorship Wars
