= California Lawyer =

American monthly legal magazine

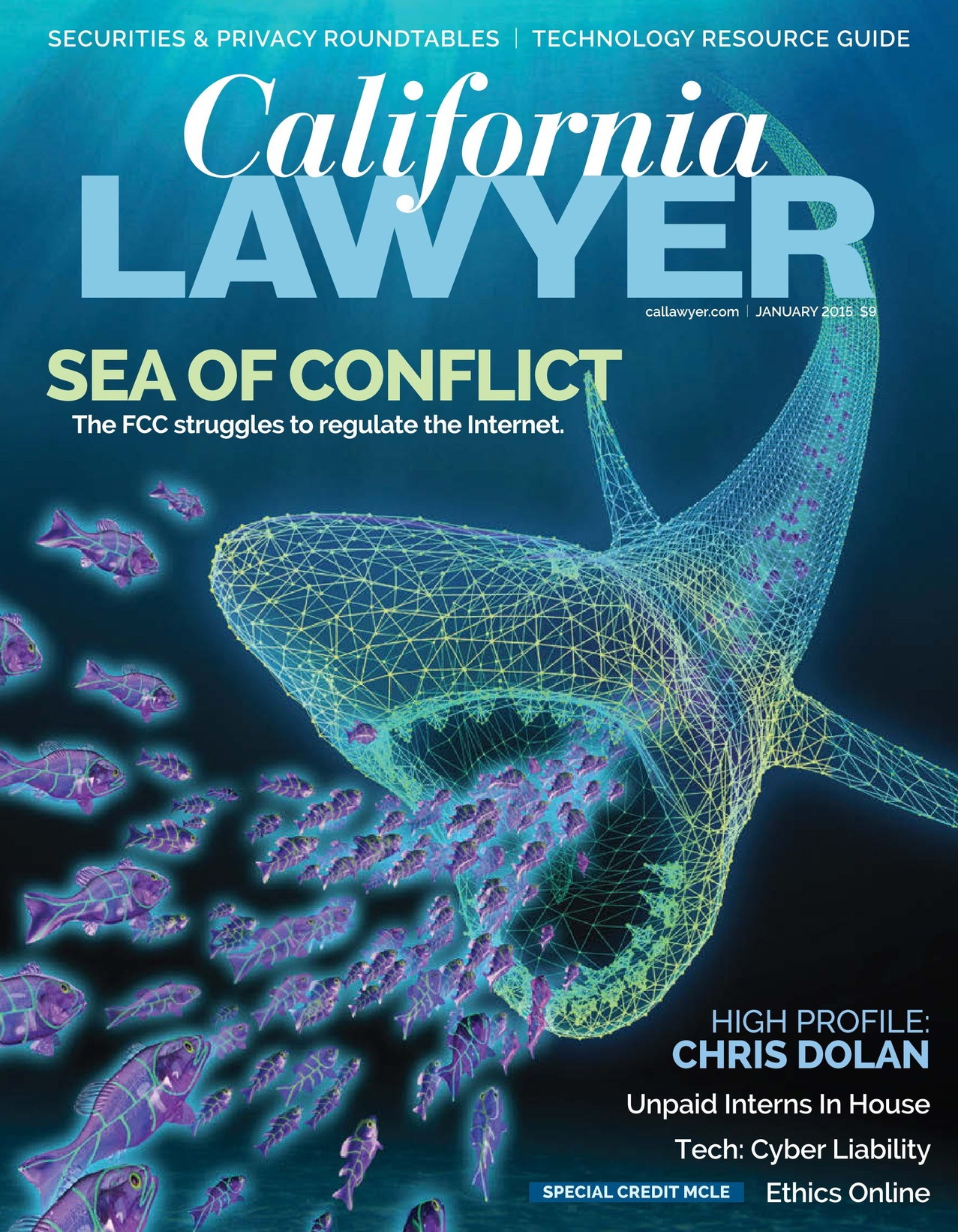
- January 2015, J.F. Podevin illustration for "Uncommon Carriers," by Michael Bobelian
- Categories: law
- Frequency: Monthly
- Publisher: State Bar of California, 1981-1987; Daily Journal Corporation, 1988-2015
- Founded: 1981
- First issue: September 1981
- Final issue: October 2015
- Country: USA
- Based in: San Francisco
- Language: English
- Website: www.callawyer.com
- ISSN: 0279-4063

California Lawyer was a monthly legal magazine based in San Francisco, California. The magazine was sent to every member of the State Bar.

== History and profile ==
California Lawyer was launched in September 1981 by the State Bar of California as an updated version of the California State Bar Journal, published by the bar since 1926.

Prior to its launch, a prospectus for the magazine compared it to Business Week or Fortune for the California legal community. Edited by a staff of journalists and supported by advertising, California Lawyer offered legal news, as well as professional and general-interest articles.

But critics asserted the new magazine "virtually extinguished" attorney participation in bar publications, and despite its financial goals relied on mandatory annual membership dues for operating expenses.

In July 1987, the State Bar's board of governors, pressured by legislators to eliminate a budget deficit, voted to eliminate all funds for California Lawyer—effectively killing the magazine.

In October 1987 the State Bar reached agreement with Charles T. Munger, chairman of the Daily Journal Corp. and publisher of the Los Angeles Daily Journal. The no-money sale committed Munger to include 12 pages of the State Bar's news and notices, to be written and edited by the bar, in each issue of California Lawyer. In April 1993 the bar's board of governors terminated the Daily Journal contract and voted to publish a tabloid newspaper for its members.

Once wholly independent, California Lawyer sought a wider audience for legal journalism, selling copies in bookstores and newsstands statewide. During this period, California Lawyer also produced two quarterly publications: House Counsel (1996-2002) and 8-K (2004-2006). In addition, beginning in 1996, the magazine staff recognized outstanding work by lawyers in a broad range of practice areas with annual California Lawyer Attorney of the Year (CLAY) awards.

Faced with declining revenue from display and classified advertising, the Daily Journal Corp. ceased publishing California Lawyer in September 2015. The callawyer.com website continues to publish articles online. The magazine's print edition remains part of California's legal publishing history, with archived issues documenting legal developments and professional issues spanning more than three decades.
