= Georgia State University Law Review =

- Discipline: Legal studies
- Language: English
- Edited by: Kassi N. Conley

Publication details
- History: 1984-present
- Publisher: Georgia State University College of Law (United States)
- Frequency: Quarterly

Standard abbreviations
- Bluebook: Ga. St. U. L. Rev.
- ISO 4: Ga. State Univ. Law Rev.

Indexing
- ISSN: 8755-6847

Links
- Journal homepage

The Georgia State University Law Review is a law review edited and published by students at Georgia State University College of Law. In addition to scholarly articles, each fall the Law Review publishes a detailed legislative review of the activities of the Georgia General Assembly known as the Peach Sheets. The Peach Sheets serve as the state's only legislative history.

== Rankings ==
In 2013, ExpressO ranked the Law Review 83rd among the 100 Most Popular General Student Law Reviews, based upon submissions. In 2014, ExpressO's ranking for the Law Review increased to 47th, and then in 2015 the ranking increased again to 33rd.

== The Membership Selection Process ==
Two factors go into the determining which students receive invitations to join the Law Review. First, the journal considers the academic rank of the students. The full-time rising 2L class and part-time rising 3L class are ranked together in the summer after completing the first year full time curriculum. Second, students may choose to participate in the summer writing competition held by the Law Review.

The top 10 students in academic class rank receive an automatic invitation to join Law Review. Next, the top 10 written submissions receive an invitation. Finally, a composite score weighing the class rank and written submission equally is generated and the top 10-20 scores receive an invitation.
