= Net Nanny =

Content-control software

- The Net Nanny 6 interface, shown on a computer running Windows XP.
- Developer: SafeToNet
- Stable release: 10.8.0 / September 2021
- Operating system: Microsoft Windows, Apple OS X, iOS, Android, ChromeOS, Fire OS
- Type: Content Control
- License: Proprietary EULA
- Website: Net Nanny Homepage

Net Nanny is a content-control software suite marketed primarily towards parents as a way to monitor and control their child's computer and phone activity.

== Features ==
The original version of Net Nanny was released in 1994. It could filter any characters typed, read, or received by the computer, along with IRC content, and could block images and mask profanity. Modern versions allow complete remote administration of child devices through a web portal or parent applications. Some of the features offered are:

- Allow or block usage of child devices using ad-hoc controls or through a schedule
- Monitor and block Internet content in various categories
- Create custom blacklists and whitelists for websites
- Track search engine usage, enforce safe search, and receive warnings for flagged words
- Place daily time limits on device use
- Monitor and allow/block applications installed on devices
- Track the location of mobile devices
- Apply different rules for individual children

Web pages (including dynamic pages) are blocked by content rather than URL, even over HTTPS. This prevents children from accessing blocked websites through proxies.

== History ==
Net Nanny was designed, created and founded by Gordon Ross in 1994 in Vancouver; operations moved to Bellevue, Washington in 2000. He became inspired to create an internet protection service for children, families and organizations, after viewing a sting operation on a pedophile soliciting a child online. In 1997, Net Nanny had sold 200,000 copies of its filter. In 1998, the company expanded its offerings beyond family protection when it launched BioPassword, a biometric security access system based on technology it acquired from Stanford University. On November 14, 2002, Net Nanny filed for bankruptcy and was sold to BioNet Systems, LLC, a maker of biometric security software in Issaquah, Washington. LookSmart Ltd, a commercial web search company based in San Francisco, acquired Net Nanny for $5.3 million in stock and cash in April 2004.

In January 2007, Net Nanny was purchased by ContentWatch Inc and moved to Salt Lake City. The product line was expanded to include security and business-oriented solutions. Mobile browsers for iOS and Android were released in June 2012 at the Consumer Electronics Show. These also allowed parents to monitor and manage the applications on the phone. In 2013, Net Nanny Social was launched to allow parents to monitor their children's social media activity and to protect against cyber bullying, cyber stalking, grooming by sexual predators, and the spread of sensitive images and videos. Features were added to the desktop applications to help adults who wanted their internet content filtered. In May 2014, the Brooklyn Public Library chose Net Nanny to filter content and applications on its Android tablets to ensure compliance with the Children's Internet Protection Act.

Zift, a digital parenting company, acquired Net Nanny from ContentWatch in 2016 and moved most operations to Philadelphia. In May 2019, Zift's applications were rebranded and launched as Net Nanny 10 for all supported platforms. In 2021, Net Nanny merged with SafeToNet, a British cyber-safety company headquartered in London.

== Reception ==
Net Nanny was rated first by TopTenReviews.com in "Internet Filter Software" and fourth in "Parental Control Software" in 2017. A review in PCMag stated that "Net Nanny is fully at home in the modern, multi-device world of parental control, and it still has the best content filtering around."

== See also ==
- Comparison of content-control software and providers
