= Marjorie Heins =

American lawyer (born 1946)

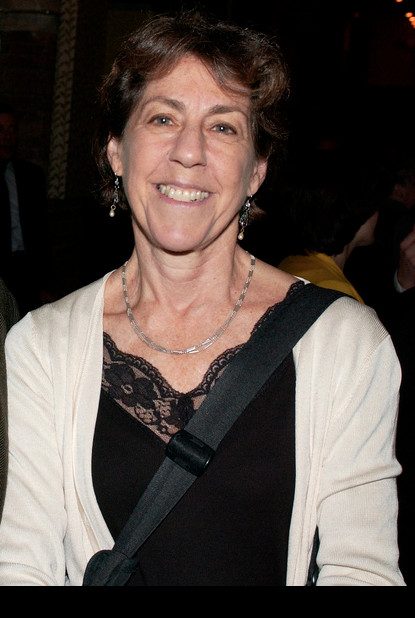
- Born: 1946 (age 79–80)
- Education: Cornell University (BA); Harvard Law School (JD)
- Occupations: lawyer and writer
- Organization: Free Expression Policy Project
- Awards: Eli M. Oboler Award; First Amendment Hero; Luther McNair Award
- Website: marjorieheins.academia.edu

Marjorie Heins (born 1946) is a First Amendment lawyer, writer and founder of the Free Expression Policy Project.

== Education ==
Heins received a B.A., with distinction, from Cornell University in 1967. She received her J.D. (magna cum laude) from Harvard Law School in 1978. She was admitted to the bar of Massachusetts in 1978 and New York in 1993.

== Career ==
Heins started as a journalist in the 1970s in San Francisco with publications including the underground San Francisco Express Times. She was also an anti-war activist during the Vietnam War.

=== American Civil Liberties Union ===
In the 1980s as staff counsel at the Massachusetts chapter of the American Civil Liberties Union (ACLU), Heins litigated numerous civil rights matters, including LGBT rights and free speech. One matter involved a litigation against Boston University for the discharge of the dean of students on the basis of her complaints about discrimination on the part of the university. This story is told in Cutting the Mustard (1988). Heins also investigated the Boston Police Department's treatment of the notorious Carol Stuart murder case, in which a white man murdered his wife but claimed to be a victim of a carjacking by an African American man.

From 1989 to 1991, she served as editor-in-chief of the Massachusetts Law Review. In 1991–92, she was chief of the Civil Rights Division at the Massachusetts Attorney General's Office.

She founded and directed the Arts Censorship Project at the American Civil Liberties Union from 1991 to 1998, during the years in which arts censorship were a particularly controversial and active field. During that time, she worked on a number of high-profile arts censorship matters. Heins was co-counsel on the ACLU's Reno v. ACLU brief to the U.S. Supreme Court, which led to its striking down the Communications Decency Act as a violation of the First Amendment. Heins was also co-counsel on Karen Finley's landmark lawsuit against the National Endowment for the Arts, National Endowment for the Arts v. Finley.

=== Academics ===
Heins has taught at Boston College Law School, Florida State University College of Law, the University of California-San Diego (UCSD), New York University (NYU), Tufts University, and the American University of Paris.

At UCSD, she created courses in "Censorship, Culture and American Law" and "Political Repression and the Press: Red Scares in U.S. History and Law." At NYU, she taught "Censorship and American Culture." At the American University of Paris, she taught "Free Expression and the Media: Policy and Law."

She was a fellow at NYU's Brennan Center for Justice, 2004–2007. In 2011, she was a fellow at NYU's Frederic Ewen Academic Freedom Center while researching her book, Priests of Our Democracy: The Supreme Court, Academic Freedom, and the Anti-Communist Purge.

She is currently an adjunct professor in the Department of Media, Culture, and Communication of NYU's Steinhardt School of Culture, Education, and Human Development. She is also a docent in the Impressionism/Post-Impressionism collection at the Metropolitan Museum of Art.

== Cases Litigated ==
Heins' litigation includes:

- Urofsky v. Gilmore, 216 F.3d 401 (4th Cir. 2000) (argued for professors challenging constitutionality of Virginia law restricting access to sexually explicit material on work computers)
- National Endowment for the Arts v. Finley, 524 U.S. 569 (1998) (ACLU co-counsel for artists challenging NEA funding criteria as impermissibly viewpoint-based and vague)
- Reno v. American Civil Liberties Union, 521 U.S. 844 (1997) (ACLU co-counsel for coalition challenging Communications Decency Act, which restricted "indecent" speech on the Internet)

== Bibliography ==
Books

- Priests of Our Democracy: The Supreme Court, Academic Freedom, and the Anti-Communist Purge (New York: NYU Press, 2013) (ISBN 9780814790519)
- Not in Front of the Children: "Indecency," Censorship, and the Innocence of Youth (2001) (ISBN 0-8090-7399-4)
- Sex, Sin and Blasphemy: A Guide to America's Censorship Wars (1993; rev. 1998) (ISBN 1-56584-048-8)
- Cutting the Mustard: Affirmative Action and the Nature of Excellence (1988) (ISBN 0-571-12974-9)
- Strictly Ghetto Property: The Story of Los Siete de la Raza (1972) (ISBN 0-87867-010-6)

Other works

- "Banning Words: A Comment on 'Words That Wound'", 18 Harvard Civil Rights-Civil Liberties Law Review 585 (Summer 1983)
- "In Memoriam: Benjamin Kaplan," 124 Harvard Law Review 1351 (2011).

== Awards and honors ==
- 1991 - Luther McNair Award (Civil Liberties Union of Massachusetts) for significant contributions to civil liberties
- 1992 - "First Amendment Hero" (Boston Coalition for Freedom of Expression)
- 1993 - "First Amendment Hero" (Boston Coalition for Freedom of Expression)
- 2002 - Eli M. Oboler Award (American Library Association) for best published work in intellectual freedom for Not in Front of the Children (2002)
- 2013 - Hugh M. Hefner First Amendment Award, for Priests of Our Democracy: The Supreme Court, Academic Freedom, and the Anti-Communist Purge
- Nov. 21, 2013 - 23rd Davis, Markert, Nickerson Lecture on Academic and Intellectual Freedom
