= Cut and run =

English expression

Cut and run or cut-and-run is an idiomatic verb phrase meaning to "make off promptly" or to "hurry off". The phrase was in use by the 1700s to describe an act allowing a ship to make sail quickly in an urgent situation, by cutting free an anchor. Though initially referring to a literal act, the phrase was used figuratively by the mid-1800s in both the United States and England. The phrase is used pejoratively in political language, implying a panicked and cowardly retreat, and it has been used by politicians as a criticism of calls to withdraw troops from various armed conflicts, becoming particularly associated with the Iraq War and with the diction of the United States Republican Party. It has also been used in other contexts, such as in World War II military slang and to refer to a container shipping practice.

== Origin ==
The phrase "to cut and run" was in use by the early 1700s, and Oxford English Dictionary cited the earliest printed usage of the phrase to The Boston News-Letter in 1704.

It was defined by Englishman David Steel in 1794 as "to cut the cable and make sail instantly, without waiting to weigh anchor"; late 19th century nautical dictionaries provide the same definition. Steel further described the practice as "quick but very expensive" but sometimes necessary in urgent or emergency situations, such as when the anchor is hooked on rocks and cannot be retrieved, in bad weather, when the anchor is on lee shore and the ship is in danger of embayment, or when one must quickly escape or pursue an enemy. This practice was long in use by then, as it was described in 1623 by Henry Mainwaring in The Seaman's Dictionary: "Cut the cable in the hawse; that is most commonly used when we ride in some storm and desire to set sail, but cannot stay the weighing of the anchor for fear of driving too much to leeward, or the like." Instead of cutting the anchor by axe at the hawsehole, Steel offered an alternate method of slipping the anchor cable if time permitted, a method he felt wiser than cutting as it potentially prevented loss of anchor and cable.

An alternative origin was given by Peter Kemp in 1976 and Richard Mayne in 2000 in reference to cutting a painter rope to release a moored ship or, on square rig ships, cutting ropeyarns holding sails stopped to the yards to let them fall unfurled. Mayne felt this origin more plausible than a practice of cutting an anchor cable, given that anchors were expensive.

== Figurative usage ==
Though "cut and run" initially referred to a literal act, it later came to be used figuratively. This usage was noted in The Sailor's Word-Book (1867) with the definition "to move off quickly; to quit occupation; to be gone". Oxford English Dictionary defines the figurative, colloquial usage as "to make off promptly" or to "hurry off". This usage initially conveyed a swift—though not necessarily panicked or disorganized—departure, and it appears in this sense in White-Jacket (1850) by American author Herman Melville, in Great Expectations (1861) by English author Charles Dickens, and in an 1863 personal letter by Alfred, Lord Tennyson.

In 2003, Paul Dickson defined the phrase in American military slang during World War II as describing an "operation consisting of a sudden attack followed by an immediate withdrawal, before a counterattack can be mounted". Admiral Sir James Somerville used the phrase in this sense in summarizing the March 1942 operations of the Eastern Fleet for Hutchinson's Pictorial History of the War (1945).

The phrase is also used in container shipping to refer to a practice where a vessel will leave at its prescribed departure time whether or not planned operations are finished; the operations are most often loading, so the vessel will leave behind cargo, but it may also refer to unloading. A vessel will cut and run for a variety of reasons, such as: to keep a schedule after delays and arrive at the next port on time, the berthing window ended, priority is being given to another vessel, or no stevedores are booked.

=== In politics ===
In May 2004, William Safire in The New York Times noted that the phrase, when used in reference to politics and war, lost its "lighthearted sense" and came to become a pejorative implying panic and "cowardice, going beyond an honorable surrender" and is "said in derogation of a policy to be opposed with the utmost repugnance". Dana Milbank characterized the phrase as a slogan used by members of United States Republican Party, and in December 2015, Robert Entman identified the phrase as one of numerous memes or slogans that "trigger a series of instant, clear mental associations" lending to the "communicative success" of the Republican Party. Linguist George Lakoff stated that the phrase is an example of the Republican Party's skill at "distilling an issue to a simple phrase" and analyzed the phrase as one that "presupposes that the opposite is to stand and fight". In comments discussing the Iraq War, Leon Panetta and Evan Bayh positioned "stay the course" as the direct opposite.

In the United States, the phrase saw usage by politicians, both in the Republican Party and the Democratic Party, as a criticism of calls to withdraw from armed conflicts including the Lebanese Civil War, Vietnam War, Somali Civil War, and Iraq War, with which it became particularly associated. Safire described the phrase as becoming "as highly charged as the war in Iraq" and characterized opposition to the war difficult due to George W. Bush's use of the phrase in April 2004. It was also used in similarly in Australia in reference to the Iraq War and the War in Afghanistan and in the United Kingdom in reference to the Iraq War.

The phrase was also used during the 2016 Republican presidential debates by Jeb Bush to describe Marco Rubio in reference to the Gang of Eight and immigration reform. Variations on the phrase were used by Ken Mehlman, then Chairperson of the United States Republican National Committee, to describe the Democratic Party's call to withdraw troops from the Iraq War: "Some are saying we need to cut and run, others are saying we need to cut and jog, and still others are saying we need to cut and walk."

The term has also been used to criticise austerity policies towards public services in the United Kingdom and the United States.

== See also ==
- Stay the course

== Notes and references ==
=== Bibliography ===
- Dickson, Paul (2003). War Slang: American Fighting Words and Phrases Since the Civil War (2nd ed.). Washington, D.C.: Brassey's. ISBN 9781574887105.
- Kemp, Peter, ed. (February 24, 1994) [1976]. The Oxford Companion to Ships and the Sea (Reprint ed.). Oxford University Press. ISBN 978-0192820846.
- Mainwaring, Henry; Mainwaring, G.E.; Perrin, W.G. (2019). The Life and Works of Sir Henry Mainwaring. Vol. II. Routledge. ISBN 978-1911248828.
- Safire, William (2008). Safire's Political Dictionary. Oxford: Oxford University Press. ISBN 978-0195340617.
- Steel, David (May 19, 2011) [First published 1794]. The Elements and Practice of Rigging, Seamanship, and Naval Tactics. Cambridge University Press. ISBN 978-1108026543.
