= Cutting the Mustard =

1987 non-fiction book by Marjorie Heins

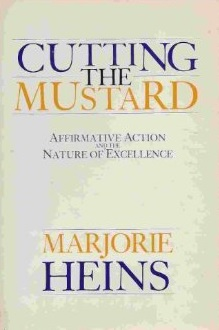
- Book cover
- Author: Marjorie Heins
- Original title: Cutting the Mustard: Affirmative Action and the Nature of Excellence
- Language: English
- Subject: Affirmative action
- Genre: Law
- Published: 1987
- Publisher: Faber and Faber
- Publication place: United States
- Media type: Hardcover
- Pages: 213
- ISBN: 978-0-571-12974-4
- OCLC: 15653313
- Preceded by: Strictly Ghetto Property: The Story of Los Siete de la Raza
- Followed by: Sex, Sin, and Blasphemy: A Guide to America's Censorship Wars

Cutting the Mustard: Affirmative Action and the Nature of Excellence is a 1987 non-fiction book by civil libertarian and United States lawyer Marjorie Heins about the Equal Protection Clause of the Fourteenth Amendment to the United States Constitution and its relationship to affirmative action and sexism. Heins discusses the case of Nancy Richardson, dean of student affairs at the Boston University School of Theology, who was removed from her position by the school's administration in 1981. Heins represented Richardson in an unsuccessful lawsuit against Boston University for wrongful termination and sexism. Cutting the Mustard recounts the case, interspersing reflections on the lawsuit with a discussion of relevant case law, decisions by the Supreme Court of the United States related to affirmative action and multiple criticisms of contradictory court decisions in affirmative-action cases.

The book was positively received by the Harvard Law Review which recommended From Midterms to Ministry for further information. It was also reviewed by the Women's Review of Books, Women's Rights Law Reporter and California Lawyer. A review in Library Journal by a Harvard Law School librarian criticized the book for lacking a substantive analysis of the case.

== Background ==
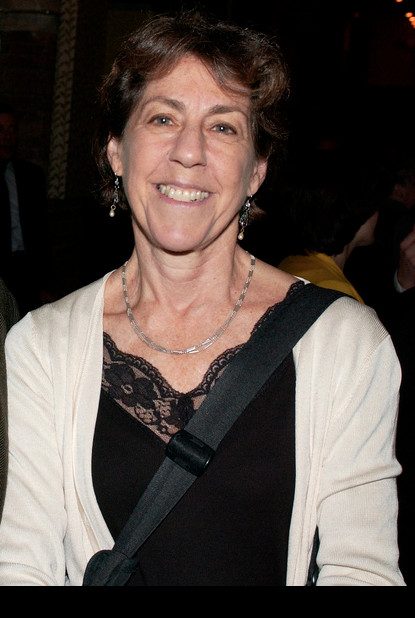
Heins at a 2009 National Coalition Against Censorship event

Marjorie Heins is an attorney with a focus on civil liberties. She received her Bachelor of Arts degree from Cornell University in 1967 and graduated magna cum laude from Harvard Law School, receiving her juris doctor degree in 1978.

Before Cutting the Mustard, Heins' book Strictly Ghetto Property: The Story of Los Siete de la Raza was published in 1972. Cutting the Mustard: Affirmative Action and the Nature of Excellence was first published in 1987.

== Content summary ==
Cutting the Mustard describes an unsuccessful case in which the author was involved as an attorney. Boston University School of Theology dean of student affairs Nancy Richardson was removed from her position by the school's administration in 1981. Heins (at the time, an American Civil Liberties Union attorney) represented Richardson in a lawsuit against the school alleging sexism.

Richardson and the school had differing views on affirmative action; she supported the concept, opposing the administration's hiring strategy for minority candidates. Heins provides background, including management's failure to hire several key candidates. One was Beverly Harrison, a professor at Union Theological Seminary in New York who was supported by the majority of the school's professors. Boston University President John Silber and nine other faculty members interviewed Harrison for two hours, criticizing her support for feminism. School of Theology dean Richard Nesmith told the school's professors that Harrison's replies to questions from the ten faculty members in her interview were inadequate and she did not "cut the mustard".

After the school did not hire Harrison, Richardson perceived a lack of support by school administration for women and minority faculty candidates. Associate Dean Nelle Slater was fired by Nesmith, who explained that the two did not "dance well". Silber vetoed the appointment of Stephen Brech Reid, an African American academic supported by professors at the School of Theology. Nesmith and Silber then created a faculty position for white male sociologist Peter L. Berger, requesting input from students and professors (satisfying affirmative-action requirements) after deciding to give the job to Berger.

Silber and Nesmith, who felt that affirmative action would lower academic hiring standards, triggered strife among students and faculty (including then-dean of students Nancy Richardson) at the School of Theology. Their opponents believed that affirmative action helped increase equality in a system developed by white men. Richardson advocated affirmative action to Nesmith, arguing that it would not lower academic standards and the school's administration should reexamine its assumptions about race, women and minorities. Richardson was fired in 1981, with Nesmith attributing her termination to "pedagogical and ideological differences" with the administration. Richardson sued, claiming discrimination by Boston University. Heins provides a background of precedent established by prior cases (some of which contradict each other), interspersed with discussions of Supreme Court decisions concerning affirmative action.

=== Minority student admissions ===
Heins discusses the Supreme Court case Regents of the University of California v. Bakke, a landmark on affirmative action for minority students in university and college admissions. The case (decided in 1978) upheld affirmative action in the admission of minority students as one of several factors to consider, not the primary one. In the lawsuit, the affirmative-action standards at UC Davis School of Medicine were challenged; the school had a policy of holding 16 out of 100 slots for minorities in the incoming class of students, regardless of qualification. Potential student Allan Bakke, a qualified white applicant, challenged the practice after he was rejected by the school. In an opinion written by Justice Lewis F. Powell, Jr., the court ruled against racial quotas at the school while allowing minority status to remain one of several criteria in the admissions process.

=== Minority hiring ===
The author contrasts Regents of the University of California v. Bakke with the Supreme Court's 1971 decision in Griggs v. Duke Power Co., which ruled that employers did not have to willfully discriminate against employees to violate Title VII of the Civil Rights Act of 1964. Chief Justice Warren E. Burger wrote that certain standardized tests given by employers could be discriminatory, even if that was not the employer's intent. Another case discussed by Heins is the 1980 Supreme Court decision in Fullilove v. Klutznick, wherein the court ruled constitutional a federal law requiring a percentage of funds for a building project to be used for minority workers.

=== Sexual discrimination ===
The final Supreme Court cases discussed by Heins include the 1987 ruling in City of Richmond v. J.A. Croson Co. and the court's 1988 opinion in Watson v. Fort Worth Bank & Trust. The former was ruled unconstitutional as an affirmative-action structure in a business to support female employees, a decision with which Heins disagreed. Watson v. Fort Worth Bank & Trust followed that decision, finding that subjective employee analysis is subject to bias and requiring an explanation from the employer of how such analysis directly relates to job performance.

=== Heins' verdict ===
After discussing Supreme Court precedent, Heins recounts the jury verdict which decided against her client by ruling that Richardson's firing was not illegal. Heins describes the trial chronologically, including the evidentiary process and testimony by witnesses. The jury's decision is examined; it found that Richardson sincerely believed that her school's administration practiced employment discrimination, and her criticism was made in good faith. However, the jury also determined that the administration did not fire Richardson because of this criticism. Heins critiques the compromise decision, contending that it reflects the bias of individual jurors rather than an interpretation of the law as applied to Richardson's firing by the school's administration. In post-trial interviews, the jurors explained they felt that it was the duty of employees (such as Richardson) respect their superiors and Nesmith was one such superior in his capacity as dean of the school of theology.

== Reception ==
The Harvard Law Review said, "In this timely book, the author uses her experiences in that trial to examine issues that still vex university faculties and presidents" (including academic qualifications for a position). In the Tennessee Law Review Stephanie A. Levin wrote that Cutting the Mustard provided "a disturbing look at how ... standards are wielded to enforce conformity in the workplace", citing the book in a discussion about nurturing and aggressive values and their respective places in the work environment.

The Women's Rights Law Reporter gave the book a generally positive review, saying that its major drawback is an inadequate analysis of the jury's decision in the Richardson case. The review concluded: "Cutting the Mustard succeeds in presenting the debate over affirmative action by questioning traditional assumptions about merit through an absorbing account of personnel decisions at Boston University's School of Theology". Although Heins describes Richardson's trial, the reviewer felt that she does not analyze the case in the larger political context.

Traci C. West discussed the Richardson case in a section of the book, From Midterms to Ministry, criticizing it for insufficient information about conflicts at Boston University. A review of Cutting the Mustard also appeared in the Women's Review of Books.

California Lawyer criticized Heins' objectivity, noting that she did not adequately explain why Richardson's case was lost. In a Library Journal review, Harvard Law School librarian Susan E. Parker wrote that the book was "essential for followers of the case, but others [cases] deserve more substantive discussion."

== See also ==
- Affirmative action in the United States
- Fisher v. University of Texas (2013)
- Equal Protection Clause
