= Appeal to fear =

Logical fallacy

An appeal to fear (also called argumentum ad metum or argumentum in terrorem) is a fallacy in which a person attempts to create support for an idea by attempting to increase fear towards an alternative. An appeal to fear is related to the broader strategy of fear appeal and is a common tactic in marketing, politics, and media (communication).

== Logic ==
This fallacy has the following argument form:

Either P or Q is true.
Q is frightening.
Therefore, P is true.

The argument is invalid. The appeal to emotion is used in exploiting existing fears to create support for the speaker's proposal, namely P. Also, often the false dilemma fallacy is involved, suggesting Q is the proposed idea's sole alternative.

== Fear, uncertainty and doubt ==
Fear, uncertainty and doubt (FUD) is the appeal to fear in sales or marketing; in which a company disseminates negative (and vague) information on a competitor's product. The term originated to describe misinformation tactics in the computer hardware industry and has since been used more broadly. FUD is "implicit coercion" by "any kind of disinformation used as a competitive weapon." FUD creates a situation in which buyers are encouraged to purchase by brand, regardless of the relative technical merits. Opponents of certain large computer corporations state that the spreading of fear, uncertainty, and doubt is an unethical marketing technique that these corporations consciously employ.

== Fear appeal in politics ==
Fear appeal is a subject studied within political science. Fear surveys indicate that, in specific contexts, messages from pro-authoritarian actors in the media are perceived with fear. Consequently, systems of oppression rely on the cultivation of fear appeals. For instance, the specific case of Belarus illustrates how communication strategies, the institutional framework, and repressive means are closely related and intertwined. At the same time, survey results show that respondents are indeed affected by these fear appeals.

== As persuasion ==
Fear appeals are often used in marketing and social policy, as a method of persuasion. Fear is an effective tool to change attitudes, which are moderated by the motivation and ability to process the fear message. Examples of fear appeal include reference to social exclusion, and getting laid-off from one's job, getting cancer from smoking or involvement in car accidents and driving.

Fear appeals are nonmonotonic, meaning that the level of persuasion does not always increase when the claimed danger is increased. A study of public service messages on AIDS found that if the messages were too aggressive or fearful, they were rejected by the subject; a moderate amount of fear is the most effective attitude changer.

Others argue that it is not the level of fear that is decisive changing attitudes via the persuasion process. Rather, as long as a scare-tactics message includes a recommendation to cope with the fear, it can work.

== See also ==
- Appeal to emotion
- Appeal to force
- Culture of fear
- Demagogue
- Embrace, extend and extinguish
- Fear appeal
- Fear mongering
- FOMO
- List of fallacies
- Moral panic
- Red Scare
- Scareware
- The terrorists have won
