= Stay the course =

Phrase meaning to pursue a goal regardless of any obstacles or criticism

"Stay the course" is a phrase used in the context of a war or battle meaning to pursue a goal regardless of any obstacles or criticism. The modern usage of this term was popularized by United States presidents George H. W. Bush, George W. Bush, and Ronald Reagan.

== Origins ==
Similar to "cut and run", a pejorative phrase used to describe cowardly withdrawal from battle, "stay the course" allegedly originated as a nautical metaphor on maintaining a constant, unaltering course while navigating. For instance, in a 2003 column, William Safire asked his readers what they knew of its origins, saying it "appears to be rooted in a nautical metaphor." In this context 'stay' refers to the ropes or guys and sheets that hold the 'course' (mainsail) in a fixed position appropriate to the heading.

Citations from the late 19th century, however, show the phrase describing horses having the stamina to remain on the course of a racetrack. Safire found the same, writing that the earliest such use found was for an 1873 rowing competition. Safire's correspondent, lexicographer Benjamin Zimmer, pointed out that before that, "citations for 'stay the course' invariably have the countervailing sense of 'to stop or check the course (of something).'" Elizabethan playwright Christopher Marlowe used it in that sense in The Tragical History of Doctor Faustus in 1588.

== In American politics ==
The phrase has had fitful use in American politics. It was used by several figures during the Vietnam War, including Gen. William Westmoreland, who wrote in his 1976 autobiography A Soldier Reports that "a lack of determination to stay the course...demonstrated in Cambodia, South Vietnam, and Laos that the alternative to victory was defeat." It had been invoked during wartime by President Lyndon Johnson in a 1967 speech and by Johnson's Undersecretary of the Air Force Townsend Hoopes.

The phrase gained a central place in rhetoric due to the publication by journalist Stewart Alsop in his 1973 memoirs of a conversation with Winston Churchill. Alsop related that the a had pondered at the close of World War II, "America, it is a great and strong country, like a workhorse pulling the rest of the world out of despond and despair. But will it stay the course?" The anecdote became a favorite of Democratic hawk Sen. Henry Jackson, and was retold by Secretary of Defense William Cohen more than once during his tenure.

=== Ronald Reagan ===
"Stay the course" was later popularized by Ronald Reagan while campaigning for Republicans during the 1982 mid-term elections, arguing against changes in his economic policies. According to The Washington Post, Reagan used the "stay the course" phrase while on a ten-day political campaign through fourteen states, and it was included in his 1982 budget message, where he sought to allay fears that his policies were causing a recession. He continued using it as a slogan through the November election.

=== George H. W. Bush ===
His vice president, George H. W. Bush, would later pick up the phrase as an argument for his election as president, both during the primaries and general campaign. His frequent use of the phrase was parodied in a Saturday Night Live sketch.

=== Bill Clinton ===
The phrase was used by Bill Clinton speaking at Bucharest's University Square in July 1997 while in Bucharest, Romania. President Clinton announced the Strategic Partnership between the United States and Romania during a historic visit to Romania in 1997.

=== George W. Bush ===
The phrase was used by George W. Bush in July 2003 while in Gaborone, Botswana, after a meeting with President Festus Gontebanye Mogae to discuss the war on terrorism. Bush, along with Vice President Dick Cheney and White House Press Secretary Scott McClellan, continually used the term afterwards to describe the Iraq War, stressing that the freedoms of the Iraqi people were at stake and that al-Qaeda would "use Iraq as an example of defeating freedom and democracy" if the United States were to withdraw.

However, the phrase was eventually dropped by Bush two weeks before the 2006 U.S. midterm elections, due to continual pressure to change his Iraq War strategy. Tony Snow has stated that this only meant that the United States needed to adjust its strategy in Iraq, and that it was not a sign of any major changes in policy. On the other hand, in an interview with George Stephanopoulos of ABC News's This Week, Bush stated that "we've never been stay the course", in response to a question asking him about his thoughts on James Baker’s comments that the strategy in Iraq should be "between 'stay the course' and 'cut and run'."

== Popular culture ==
The phrase has been repeatedly parodied by political cartoonists, ranging from animator Mark Fiore to Chip Bok of the Akron Beacon Journal. It has also been parodied by numerous television shows, such as The Colbert Report and Saturday Night Live. The phrase was also used in Pixar's movie WALL-E (2008) in a message to Axiom from the CEO of Earth, John Connor in Terminator: Salvation has the line, "If we stay the course we are dead, all dead!", and is a recurring phrase in the 2000 film The Patriot (2000). In music, Epica's song "Stay The Course" (from Requiem for the Indifferent) is a criticism of this policy and of the popular culture surrounding its use.
