= Robert Entman =

American political scientist

Robert Mathew Entman
- Born: November 7, 1949 (age 76); Brooklyn, New York City, U.S.
- Education: A.B. in political science from Duke University, M.P.P. in Public Policy Analysis from the University of California, Berkeley, Ph.D. in political science, Yale University
- Known for: Political communication
- Children: Max Entman; Emily Entman
- Awards: 2012 Humboldt Research Award from the Alexander von Humboldt Foundation
- Scientific career
- Fields: Communication studies, media studies
- Thesis: The psychology of legislative behavior: Ideology, personality, power, and policy (1977)
- Website: https://robertmentman.com/

Robert Mathew Entman (born November 7, 1949) is the J.B. and M.C. Shapiro Professor of Media and Public Affairs and Professor of International Affairs at George Washington University.

== Education ==
Entman earned his A.B. in political science from Duke University, his M.P.P. in Public Policy Analysis from the University of California, Berkeley, and his Ph.D. in political science from Yale University, where he was a National Science Foundation Fellow.

== Career ==
Before joining George Washington University, Entman taught at Duke, Northwestern University and North Carolina State University. He also served as a visiting professor at Harvard University for one semester in 1997 and as Visiting Professor of Public Policy at Duke for the 2008-09 academic year.

== Work ==
Entman's research has included studies of the portrayal of race and crime on local television news, as well as the effects of television news on Americans' desire to be involved in politics.

=== Books ===
- Entman, R. (1989) "Democracy Without Citizens: Media and the Decay of American Politics" (Oxford: Oxford University Press)
- Entman, R. and Rojecki, A. (2000) "The Black Image in the White Mind: Media and Race in America" (Chicago: University of Chicago Press)
- Entman, R. (2004) "Projections of Power: Framing News, Public Opinion, and U.S. Foreign Policy" (Chicago: University of Chicago Press)
- Entman, R. (2012) "Scandal and Silence: Media Responses to Presidential Misconduct" (Cambridge: Polity Press)

=== Edited book chapters ===
- Entman, R. (2020) "African Americans according to TV news" in Dennis, E. and Pease, E. (eds.) The Media in Black and White, p. 29-36 (London: Routledge)

=== Journal articles ===
- Entman, R. and Paletz, D. (1980) "Media and the conservative myth", Journal of Communication 30(4), p. 154-165
- Paletz, D. and Entman, R. (1980) "Presidents, Power, and the Press", Presidential Studies Quarterly 10(3), p. 416-426
- Entman, R. (1983) "The impact of ideology on legislative behavior and public policy in the states", The Journal of Politics 45(1), p. 163-182
- Entman, R. (1985) "Newspaper competition and First Amendment ideals: Does monopoly matter?", Journal of Communication 35(3), p. 147-165
- Entman, R. (1989) "How the media affect what people think: An information processing approach", The Journal of Politics 51(2), p. 347-370
- Entman, R. (1990) "Modern racism and the images of blacks in local television news", Critical Studies in Media Communication 7(4), p. 332-345
- Entman, R. (1991) "Framing US coverage of international news: Contrasts in narratives of the KAL and Iran Air incidents", Journal of Communication 41(4), p. 6-27
- Entman, R. (1992) "Blacks in the news: Television, modern racism and cultural change", Journalism Quarterly 69(2), p. 341-361
- Entman, R. M. (1993). Framing: toward clarification of a fractured paradigm. Journal of Communication, 43(4), 51–58. https://doi.org/10.1111/j.1460-2466.1993.tb01304.x
- Entman, R. (1994) "Representation and reality in the portrayal of blacks on network television news", Journalism Quarterly 71(3), p. 509-520
- Entman, R. (2003) "Cascading activation: Contesting the White House's frame after 9/11", Political Communication 20(4), p. 415-432
- Entman, R. (2007) "Framing bias: Media in the distribution of power", Journal of Communication 57(1), p. 163-173
- Entman, R. (2010) "Media framing biases and political power: Explaining slant in news of Campaign 2008", Journalism 11(4), p. 389-408

== Awards ==
Entman received the 2012 Humboldt Research Award from the Alexander von Humboldt Foundation, the University of Texas' 2011 Danielson Award for Distinguished Contributions to Communication Scholarship; the Distinguished Scholar Award from the National Communication Association; the Murray Edelman Distinguished Career Achievement Award from the American Political Science Association's Political Communication Section; and Harvard's Goldsmith Book Prize for his 2000 book The Black Image in the White Mind, which he co-authored with Andrew Rojecki.
