= Flattery =

Insincere praise spoken in order to gain favor from someone

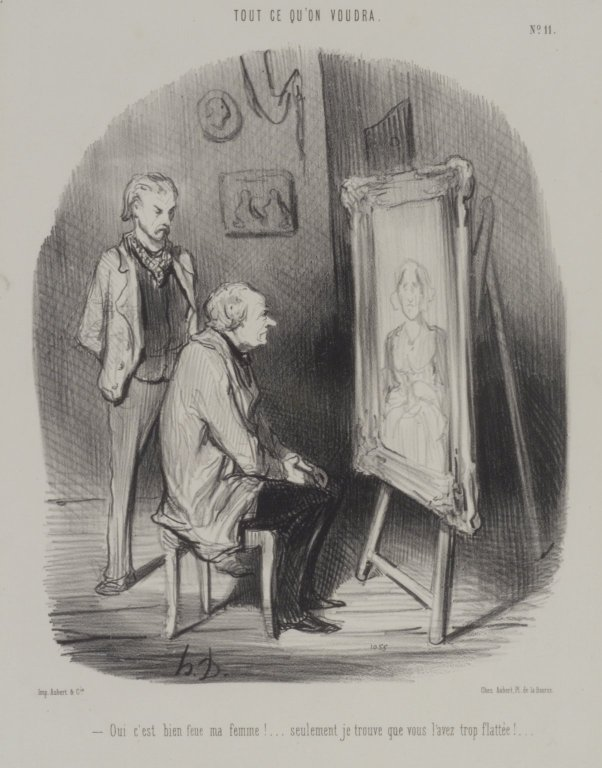
Yes, It Is My Deceased Wife!...Only You Have Flattered Her Too Much!, lithograph by Honoré Daumier, Brooklyn Museum

Flattery, also called adulation or blandishment, is the act of giving excessive compliments, generally for the purpose of ingratiating oneself with the subject. It is also used in pick-up lines when attempting to initiate romantic courtship. Historically, flattery has been used as a standard form of discourse when addressing a king or queen. In the Renaissance, it was a common practice among writers to flatter the reigning monarch, as Edmund Spenser flattered Queen Elizabeth I in The Faerie Queene, William Shakespeare flattered King James I in Macbeth, Niccolò Machiavelli flattered Lorenzo II de' Medici in The Prince, and Jean de La Fontaine flattered Louis XIV of France in his Fables.

Many associations with flattery are negative. Negative descriptions of flattery range at least as far back in history as the Bible. In the Divine Comedy, Dante depicts flatterers wading in human excrement, stating that their words were the equivalent of excrement, in the second bolgia of 8th Circle of Hell. An insincere flatterer is a stock character in many literary works. Examples include Wormtongue from J. R. R. Tolkien's The Lord of the Rings, Goneril and Regan from King Lear, and Iago from Othello.

Historians and philosophers have paid attention to flattery as a problem in ethics and politics. Plutarch wrote an essay on "How to Tell a Flatterer from a Friend". Julius Caesar was notorious for his flattery. In his In Praise of Folly, Erasmus commended flattery because it "raises downcast spirits, comforts the sad, rouses the apathetic, stirs up the stolid, cheers the sick, restrains the headstrong, brings lovers together and keeps them united." Flatterers can never be successful without the cooperation of those flattered, as "the flatterer [...] tells you your own opinion, not his".

"To flatter" is also used to refer to artwork or clothing that makes the subject or wearer appear more attractive, as in:

- The king was pleased with the portrait, as it was very flattering of his girth.
- I think I'll wear the green dress because it flatters my legs.

== See also ==
- Appeal to flattery
- Love bombing
- Manipulation
- Superficial charm
- Sycophancy
