= Argumentum ad baculum =

Threat of force to make a conclusion accepted

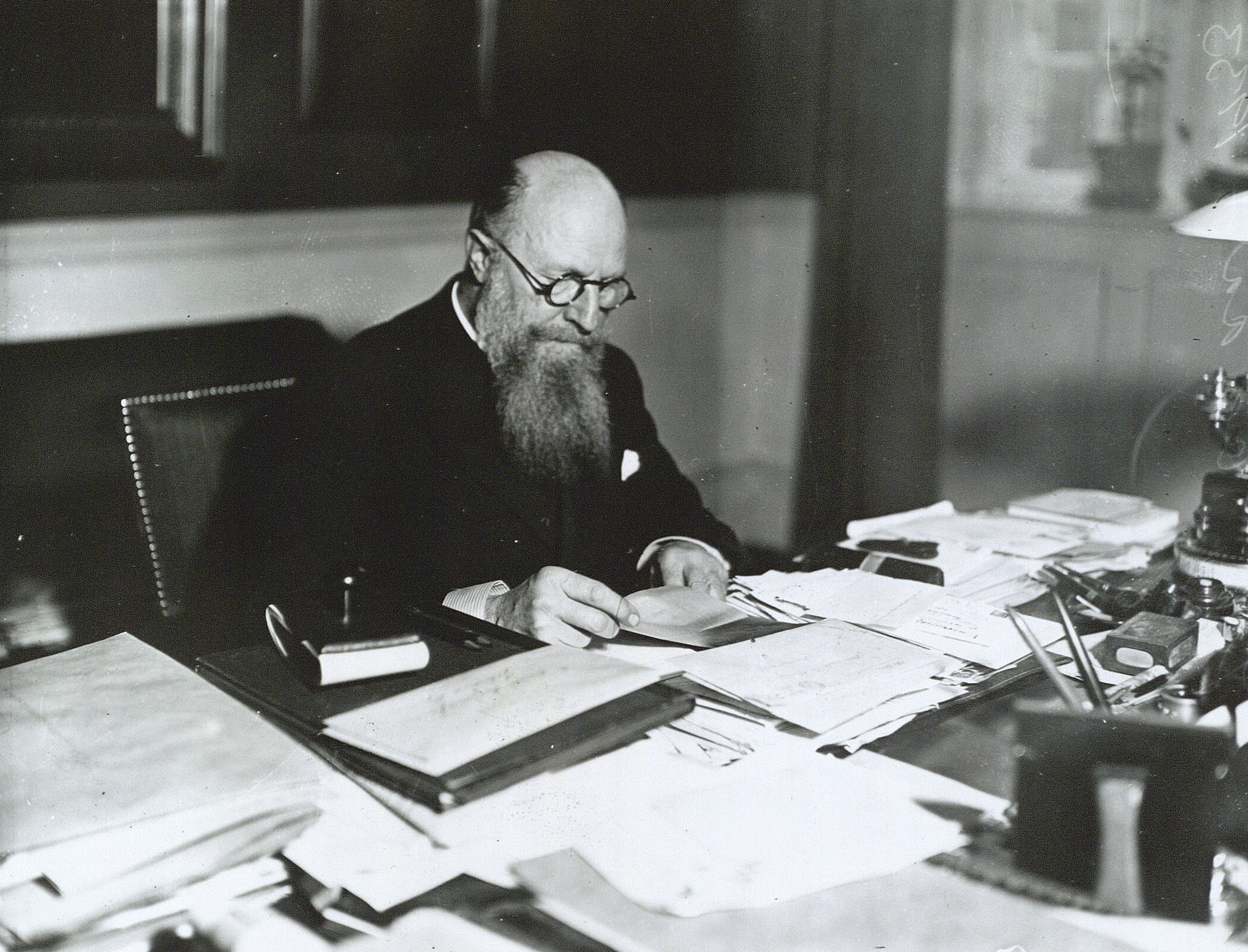
In 1940, Denmark led by prime minister Thorvald Stauning surrendered to Nazi Germany after six hours of fighting, believing further resistance would only result in the futile loss of more Danish lives.

Argumentum ad baculum (Latin for "argument to the cudgel" or "appeal to the stick") is a type of argument made when one attempts to appeal to force to bring about the acceptance of a conclusion. One participates in argumentum ad baculum when one emphasizes the negative consequences of holding the contrary position, regardless of the contrary position's truth value—particularly when the argument-maker himself causes (or threatens to cause) those negative consequences. It is a special case of the appeal to consequences. Argumentation scholar Douglas Walton states that many texts on the matter "take it for granted that ad baculum arguments are inherently fallacious" and continued that "some of the textbooks, especially some of the more interesting accounts, suggest that this type of argument may not always be fallacious, and cite instances where appealing to force or threat or fear could be reasonable in a given context. The issue raised by these provocative accounts is how one should distinguish between the fallacious and the nonfallacious use of the argumentum ad baculum".

== Examples ==
The Stanford Encyclopedia of Philosophy gives this example of argumentum ad baculum:

If you don't join our demonstration against the expansion of the park, we will evict you from your apartment;
So, you should join our demonstration against the expansion of the park.

The phrase has also been used to describe the 1856 caning of Charles Sumner, an abolitionist Senator, by one of his pro-slavery opponents, Preston Brooks, on the floor of the United States Senate.

== See also ==
- Argument from authority
- Formal fallacy
- In terrorem
- Legal threat
- Might makes right
- Proof by intimidation
