= Menaul School =

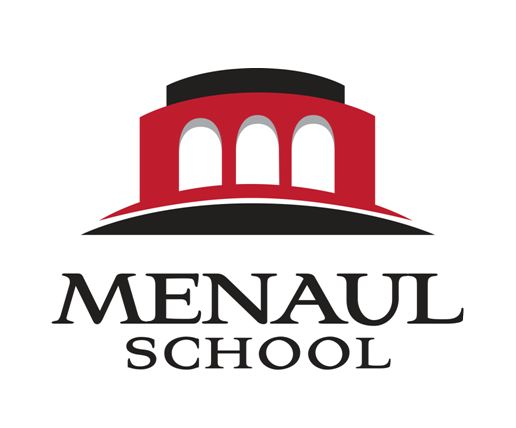

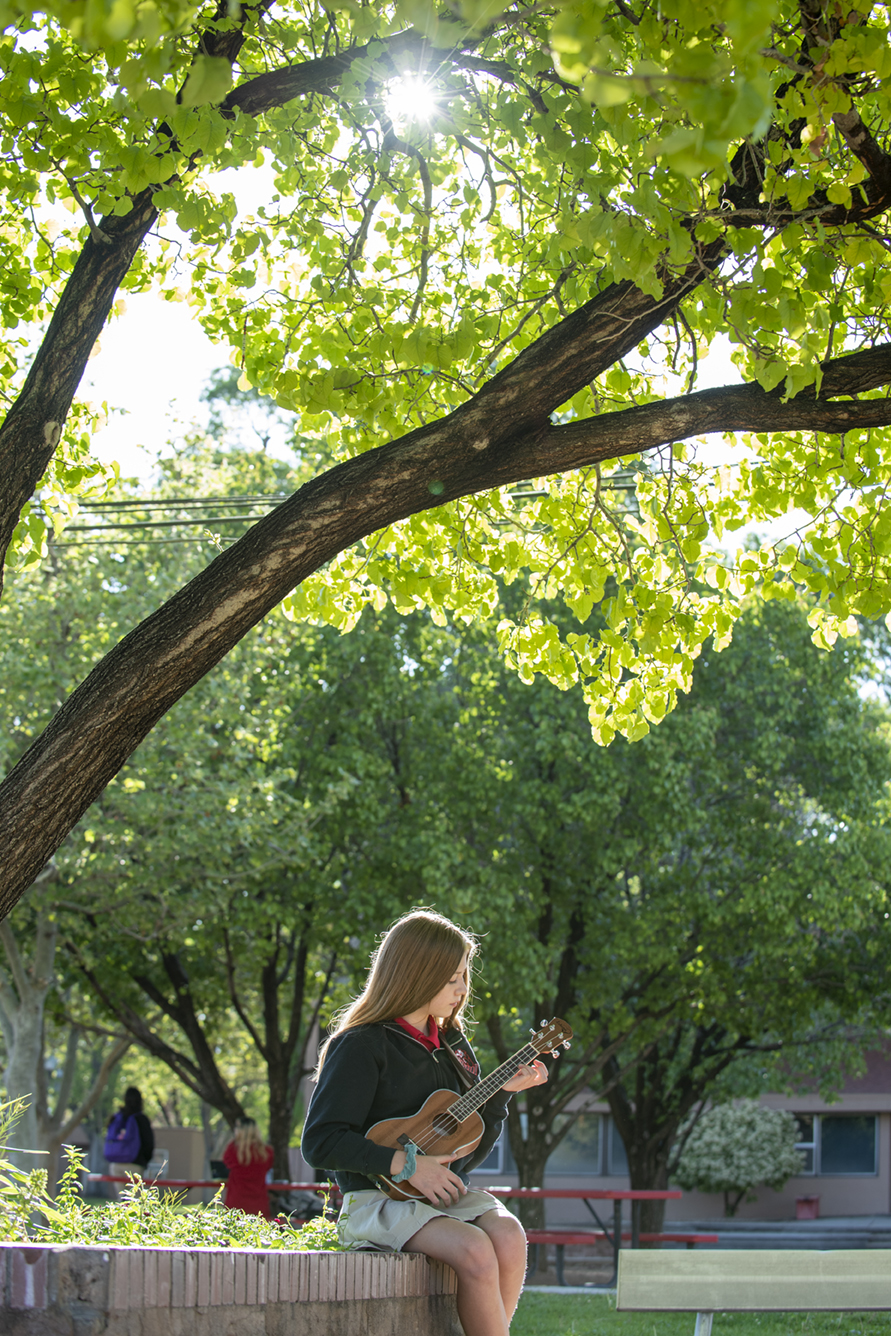

Location
- 301 Menaul Blvd. NE; Albuquerque, New Mexico 87107; United States; 35°06′38″N 106°38′17″W

Information
- Type: Independent · College-preparatory · Day · Boarding
- Motto: Spanish: Sea La Luz (Be the Light)
- Religious affiliation: Presbyterian
- Established: 1896; 130 years ago
- Founder: James Menaul; Anna McNair
- CEEB code: 320025
- President: Julie Bean
- Grades: 6–12
- Gender: Co-educational
- Enrollment: 220 (2024)
- Student to teacher ratio: 9:1
- Campus: Urban
- Campus size: 28 acres (11 ha)
- Colors: Red; Black; White
- Athletics conference: New Mexico Activities Association
- Mascot: Panther
- Accreditation: Cognia New Mexico PED
- Publication: The Petroglyph Review
- Yearbook: Sandstorm
- Website: www.menaulschool.org

Menaul School is an independent, co-educational, college preparatory day-and-boarding school located in Albuquerque, New Mexico. The Presbyterian Church established the institution in 1881 and again in 1896 as an American Indian boarding training school for the Pueblo peoples and the Hispanos of New Mexico. During the Cold War, the school shifted to its current model of admitting many international students.

Menaul School is a multicultural institution serving a diverse student body from grades 6 through 12. Menaul School is Albuquerque's most diverse school, with a longstanding majority-minority population and students currently hailing from more than 28 countries and six Native American nations and pueblos. Menaul School's campus is also the home of the Menaul Historical Library of the Southwest.

== History ==
=== Pueblo Training School ===
Under the Native American policy of the Ulysses S. Grant Administration, the federal government of the United States gave the Presbyterian Church a contract to open the Pueblo Training School in 1881 Albuquerque as "the first established boarding school in New Mexico and Arizona." The Pueblo Training School closed soon afterwards due to the large enrollment of the competing Albuquerque Indian School, also established in 1881.

=== Menaul Training School ===
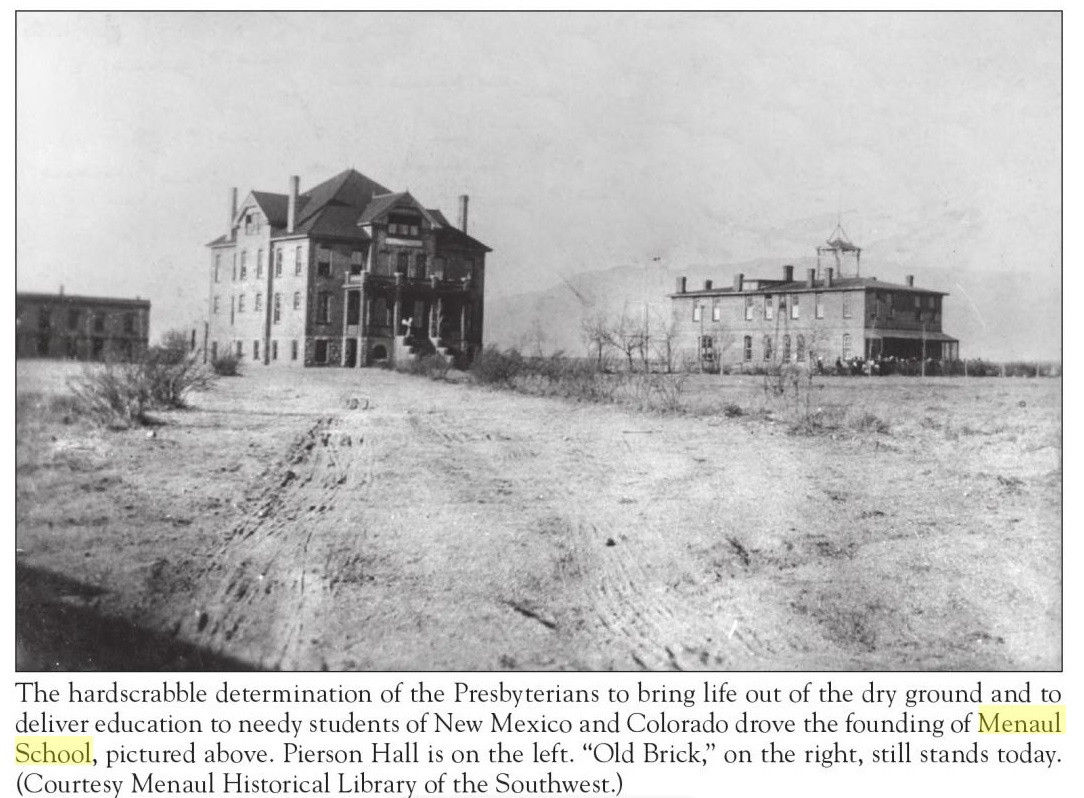
The Menaul School campus in 1896

The school was reopened in 1896 as the Menaul Training School to train "Spanish-American boys" although it would later admit girls as well. The two schools were founded by the Presbyterian Church as part of its mission education efforts, specifically to provide education to Spanish-speaking New Mexican youth. The Pueblo Training School had been renamed after the Reverend James Menaul, who had acquired funding for the site from the Presbyterian Church. Later the school was renamed again from the Menaul Training School to the Menaul School. The institution was a majority-minority institution from the beginning, although at the time most people in New Mexico were of Pueblo of Hispano descent.

=== Menaul School ===
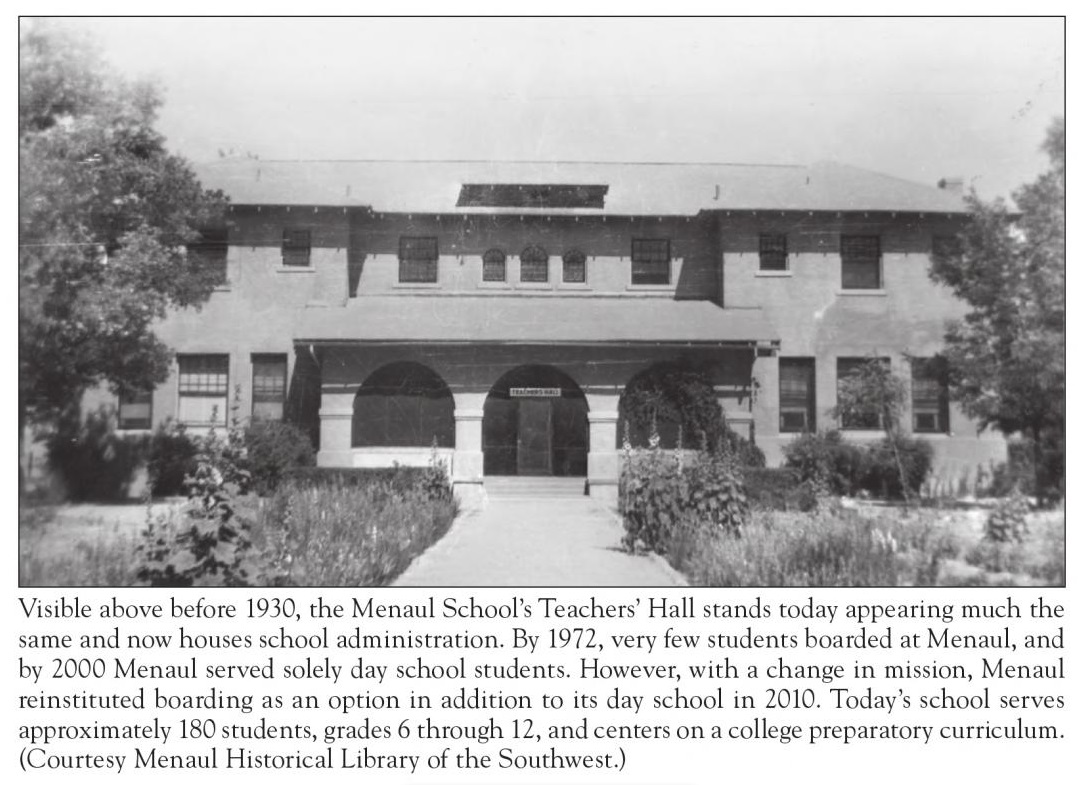
Teachers' Hall in the 1920s

The early 20th century saw significant developments at Menaul School under the leadership of Superintendent Harper Donaldson, who was appointed in 1916. During his tenure, Donaldson was instrumental in advancing the educational methods and curriculum at Menaul, including coeducational programs that began in 1934. This period also saw the school acting as a supervisory hub for more than 20 Presbyterian mission schools in New Mexico and Southern Colorado. These "plaza schools" were centers for education in rural New Mexico, and also served as hospitals and medical stations. In 2003, the last plaza school, the John Hyson School, closed.

=== Cold War ===
Post World War II, the school underwent significant changes. As New Mexico grew in population and diversity, Menaul School underwent a shift towards serving a broader demographic, including international students. Menaul School Road (now Menaul Boulevard) was paved in 1948 as Albuquerque expanded northwards. In 1957, Menaul School was authorized to offer F visas to international students, further diversifying the student body. In 1971, the Presbyterian Church formally transferred control of Menaul School to an independent board of trustees.

=== 21st century ===
Today, Menaul School is a school with a multicultural educational environment, maintaining a connection with its Presbyterian roots while continuing to adapt to the educational demands of a global community. The school's historical significance is preserved within its campus, notably at the Menaul Historical Library of the Southwest, which houses extensive archives relating to the school and the broader Presbyterian education and healthcare movement in the southwestern United States, including many of the founding documents of Presbyterian Healthcare Services.

The school retains its initial character serving a majority-minority population, with students currently hailing from more than 28 countries and six Native American Pueblos and Nations.

== Campus ==
Menaul School is situated on a historic campus in the center of Albuquerque, spanning 28 acres and featuring New Mexico's largest collection of Mission Revival buildings. Many of the older buildings on Menaul School's campus were built of adobe and Sandia mountain stone by students and faculty.

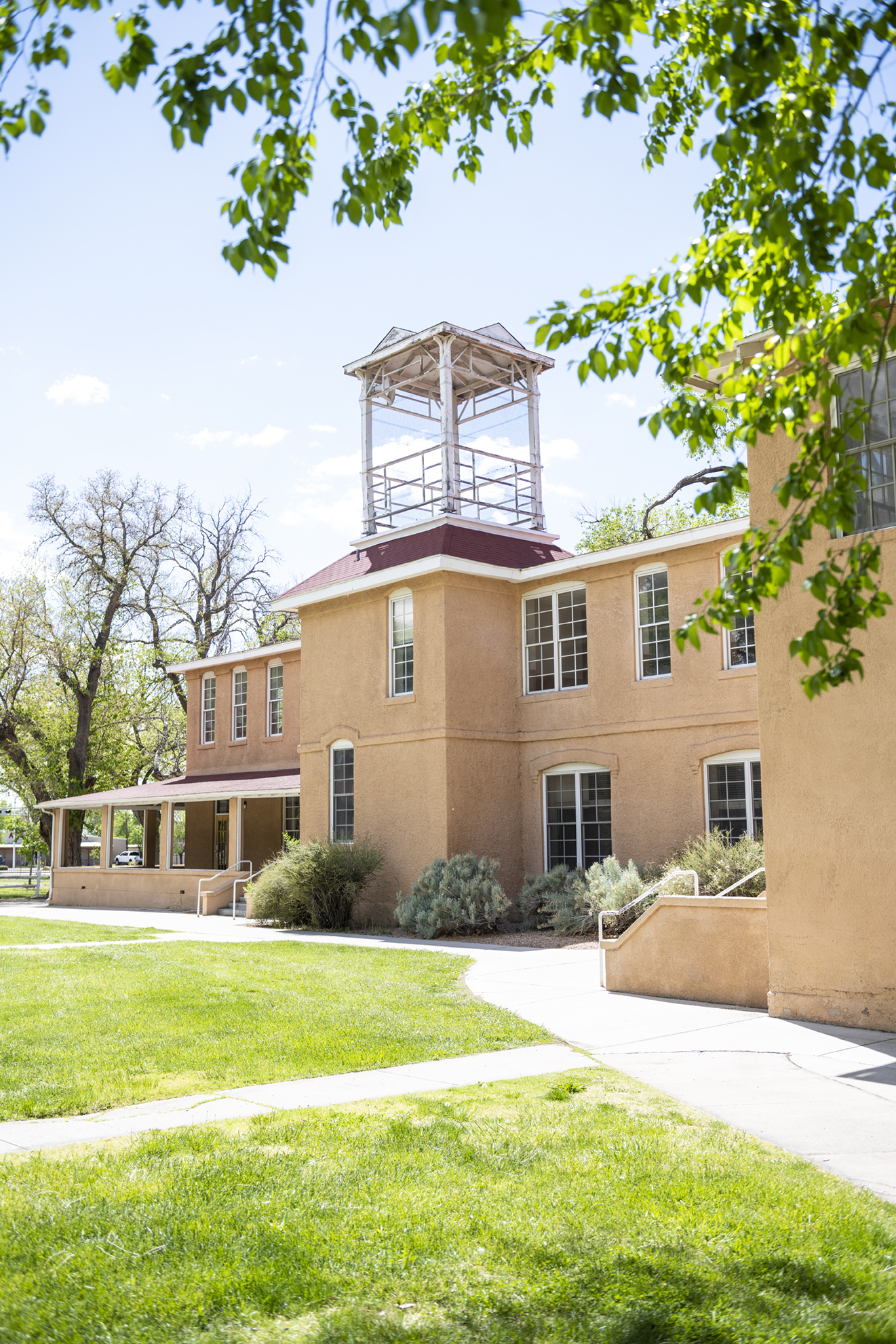
Old Brick, including the historic belltower

Menaul School's campus is the home of the Menaul Historical Library of the Southwest.

=== Historic buildings and facilities ===
- Old Brick: The oldest building on the Menaul School campus, Old Brick was first erected in 1886 and almost immediately burned down. It was rebuilt in 1890 using its original bricks. The Annex was added in 1934 and became the first girl's dormitory. Today, Old Brick is the location of humanities classrooms for the upper school.
- Donaldson Hall: First built in 1924 and originally named the Administration Building. In 1972 it was renamed after Harper Donaldson, who served as the head of school from 1916 to 1953. This building is the location of the school administration and also accommodates the middle school on the upper floor, and the chapel on the lower floor. The hall is notable for its resilience, having survived a significant fire in 1946.
- Allison Hall: Initially a dormitory building, Allison Hall was named after Matilda L. Allison, a Presbyterian educator whose students were incorporated into Menaul School in 1934, marking the transition to coeducational instruction. Allison Hall is the new home of the Menaul Historical Library.
- Helen Porter Childs Hall: Constructed in 1941 of adobe brick to house an expansion of Menaul School's home economics program, "HPC" now serves as a student life and classroom space.
- The President's Cottage: First constructed in 1906 in Queen Anne style architecture, the President's Cottage serves as the home of the Menaul School President and Head of School.
- Rendon Hall: Constructed in 1957, Rendon Hall serves as the location of science laboratories, mathematics classes, and the fine arts wing, as well as the Menaul School greenhouse.
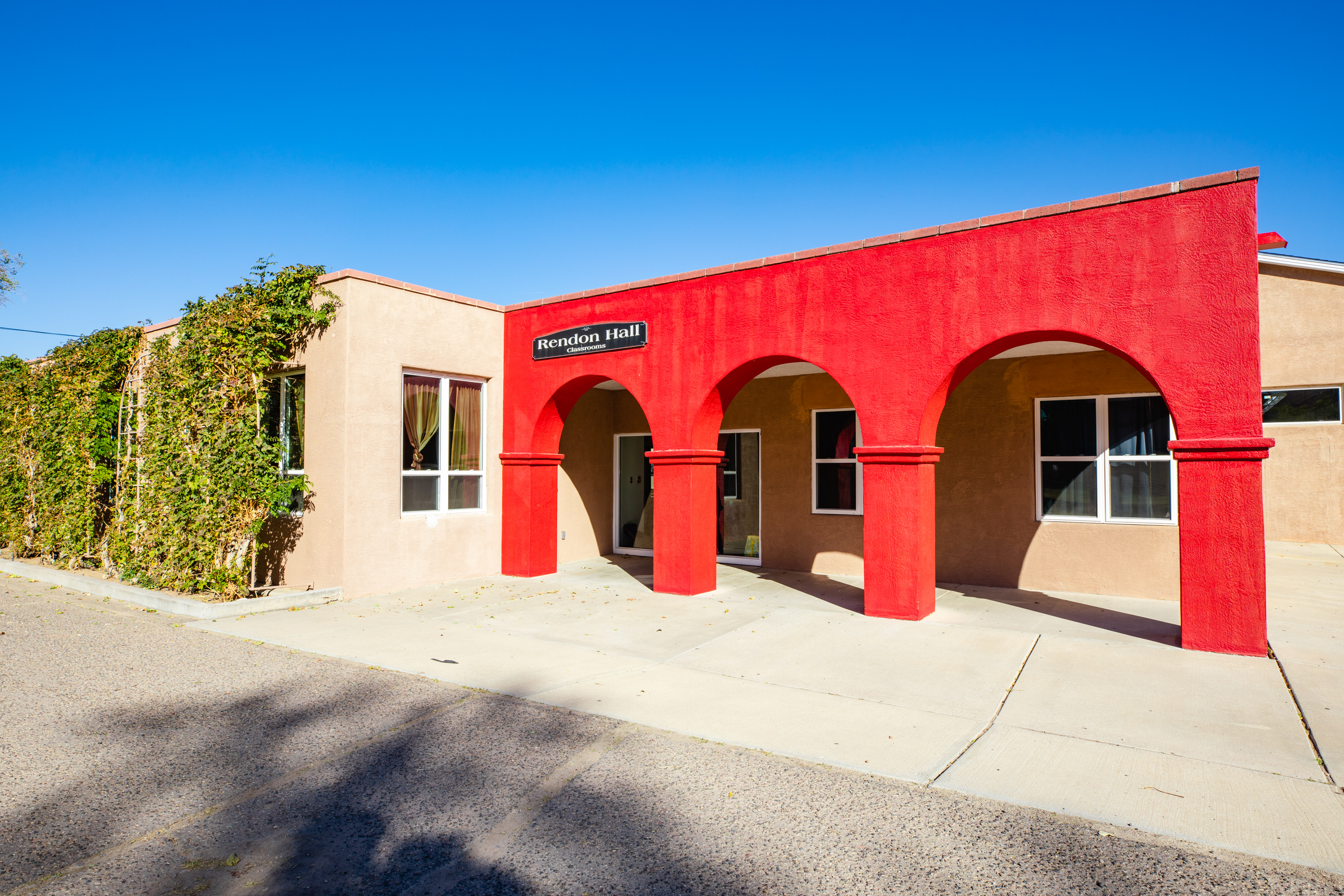
  Rendon Hall
- Teacher's Hall: Built to accommodate female faculty members in 1921. As of 2022, the building has been fully renovated and now serves as a girls' dormitory.
- Bennett Hall: Currently serving as the boys' dormitory and the location of the Performing Arts department. The building's construction in 1922 involved contributions from students and staff, highlighting the community's involvement in campus development.

== Academics ==
Menaul School provides a college-preparatory curriculum aimed at preparing students for higher education and subsequent careers. As an independent, coeducational day-and-boarding school, it incorporates a comprehensive educational approach that combines intellectual, moral, and spiritual development suitable for both domestic and international students from more than 20 countries.

=== Curriculum ===
Menaul School's academic program covers grades 6 through 12, featuring core requirements in mathematics, science, English, religion & philosophy, and social studies, along with elective courses in fine arts, performing arts, technology, and foreign languages, as well as specific courses in SAT preparation. The school offers Advanced Placement (AP) and honors classes to accommodate students seeking advanced academic challenges and college credit opportunities. Menaul School's credit requirements are significantly higher than those of the State of New Mexico, 29 credits compared to the state's requirement of 24. In 2020, Menaul School adopted an internationally-focused Integrated Mathematics curriculum.

== School officials ==
Until 1970, superintendents of Menaul School were appointed directly by the Presbyterian Church and oversaw a network of mission schools in New Mexico. In 1971, Menaul School became a private school under an independent board of trustees, and the title of leader became President and Head of School.

=== Superintendents ===
- Anna D. McNair, 1896-1897
- John Chalmers Ross, 1897–1916
- Harper C. Donaldson, 1916–1923
- John Walker (Acting), 1923–1924
- Harper C. Donaldson, 1924–1953
- Homer J. E. Townsend, 1953–1957
- Harry A. Brandt, 1957–1963
- Frank Latta, 1963–1968
- Izar A. Martinez, 1968–1970

=== Presidents and Heads of School ===
- Izar A. Martinez, 1970–1972
- Edmundo E. Vasquez, 1972–1978
- Jaime O. Quinones (Interim), 1978–1979
- Nicholas M. Hagerman, 1979–1980
- James T. Wormley, 1980–1983
- Conrado P. Gutierrez (Interim), 1983–1984
- David B. Fontaine, 1984–1989
- Kurt Knoernschild, 1989–1994
- Richard Esler II, 1994–1996
- James R. Garvin, 1996–1999
- Michael L. Gaylor, 1999–2003
- Gloria G. Mallory, 2003–2006
- Lindsey R. Gilbert, Jr., 2006–2023
- David R. Breidenbach (Interim), 2023–2024
- Julie Bean, 2024-

== Extracurricular activities ==
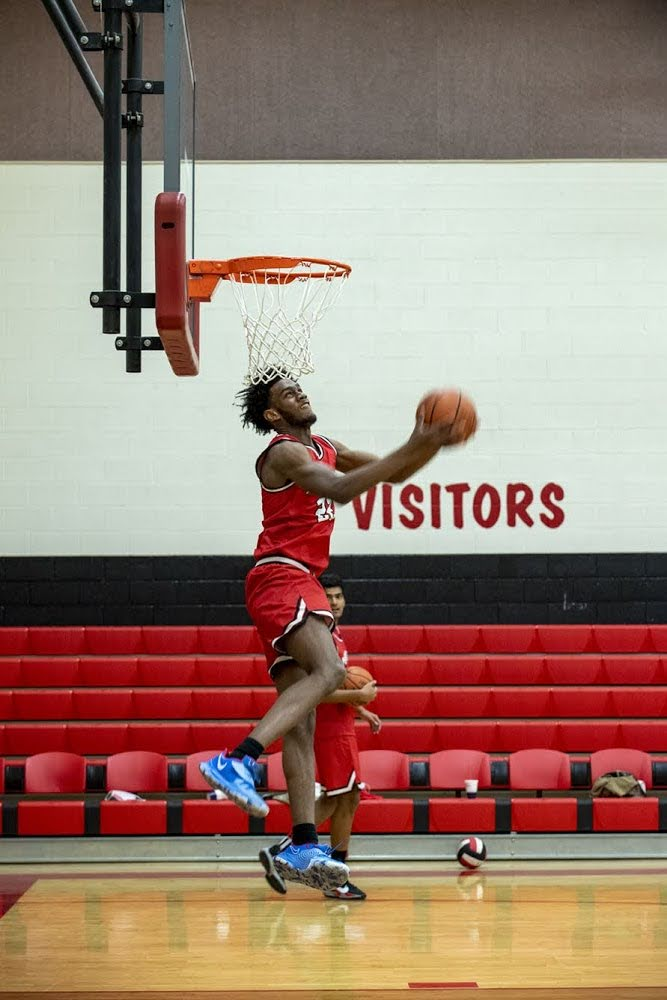
Menaul School Basketball

Menaul School offers a wide range of sports, clubs, and general extracurricular activities.

=== Sports ===
Menaul School has one of New Mexico's oldest football teams, founded in 1904. In addition to football, the school offers a variety of sports, including basketball, soccer, volleyball, track and field, cross country, flag football, and baseball. Menaul's teams, known as the Panthers, regularly compete in state and regional championships. Sports are played on Tomlinson Field, the only high school field in Albuquerque with its own lights, allowing night games.

=== Clubs and student organizations ===
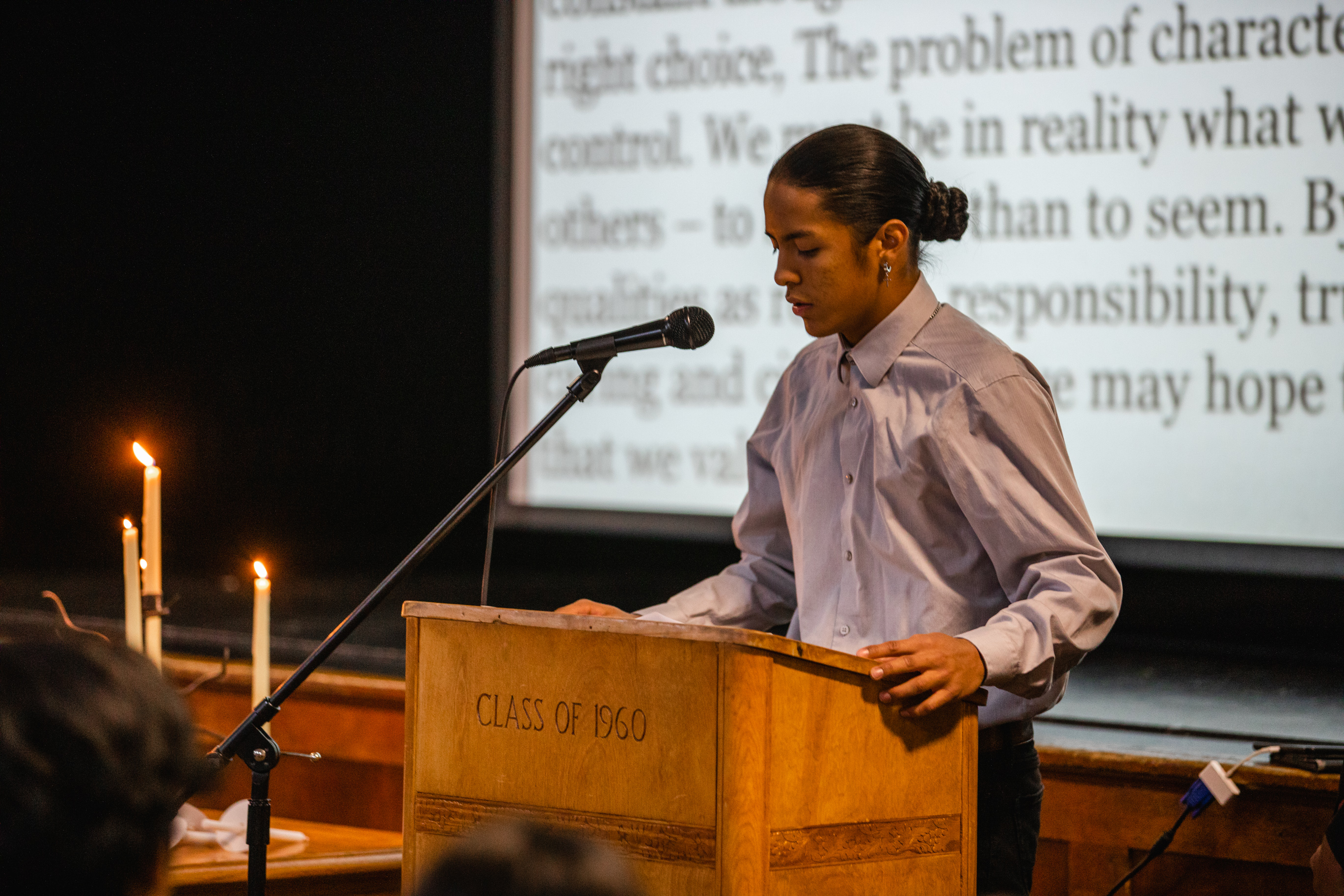
National Honor Society Induction

Menaul School offers a wide number of electives for student participation and competition. Active clubs include Model United Nations, Chess, Science Olympiad, Yearbook, Esports, National Honor Society, Chapel Club, The Petroglyph Review, English Expo, Student Government, Drama Club, Business and Investment Club, Pep Band, and the Travel Club.

== Notable alumni ==
- Cosme Garcia – Politician, state senator, educator
- Amadeo Lucero – Teacher, musician, composed the official Spanish language state song of New Mexico
- Rubén Cobos – Linguist and folklorist, author of A Dictionary of New Mexico and Southern Colorado Spanish
- Martin Candelaria – First Hispanic professor at the University of Northern Colorado
- Jesus 'Jesse' Castaneda - World record marathon walker
- Alice S. Paul – First Native American department head at the University of Arizona
- James Kwok Sing Ning – Actor
- Victor B. MacFarlane – Real estate developer, founder of MacFarlane Partners
- Arturo Madrid – Humanities professor, winner of National Humanities Medal
- Loretta Armenta – Business executive, community leader
- Levi Romero – Professor, author, poet, first New Mexico poet laureate
- Estevan Rael-Galvez – Cultural anthropologist, New Mexico state historian
- Jesse Tyler Ferguson – Actor
- Jeremiah Bitsui – Actor
- Ou Junxuan (区俊炫) – Professional basketball player

== Culture and traditions ==
Mission Week is an upper school tradition where students travel in an expanding sphere into Albuquerque, the state, neighboring states, and finally internationally to engage in service learning. Mission Week takes place each spring and the work Menaul School students undertake is regularly featured by the Presbyterian Church in its national publications.

At the commencement ceremony, graduating seniors may share the stage and be handed their diploma by Menaul School alumni family members.

Menaul School's football team, established in 1904, significantly influenced the adoption of football in New Mexico and contributed to the color traditions of both the University of New Mexico (UNM) and Albuquerque Academy. In its early years, Menaul competed against UNM, sharing equipment and materials with the university, leading UNM to adopt red—a Menaul color—as part of their team colors. Similarly, when Albuquerque Academy needed equipment and a field, they were allowed to use Menaul's facilities and uniforms, resulting in the Academy also adopting red and black, the colors of Menaul's donated football uniforms.

== Affiliations ==
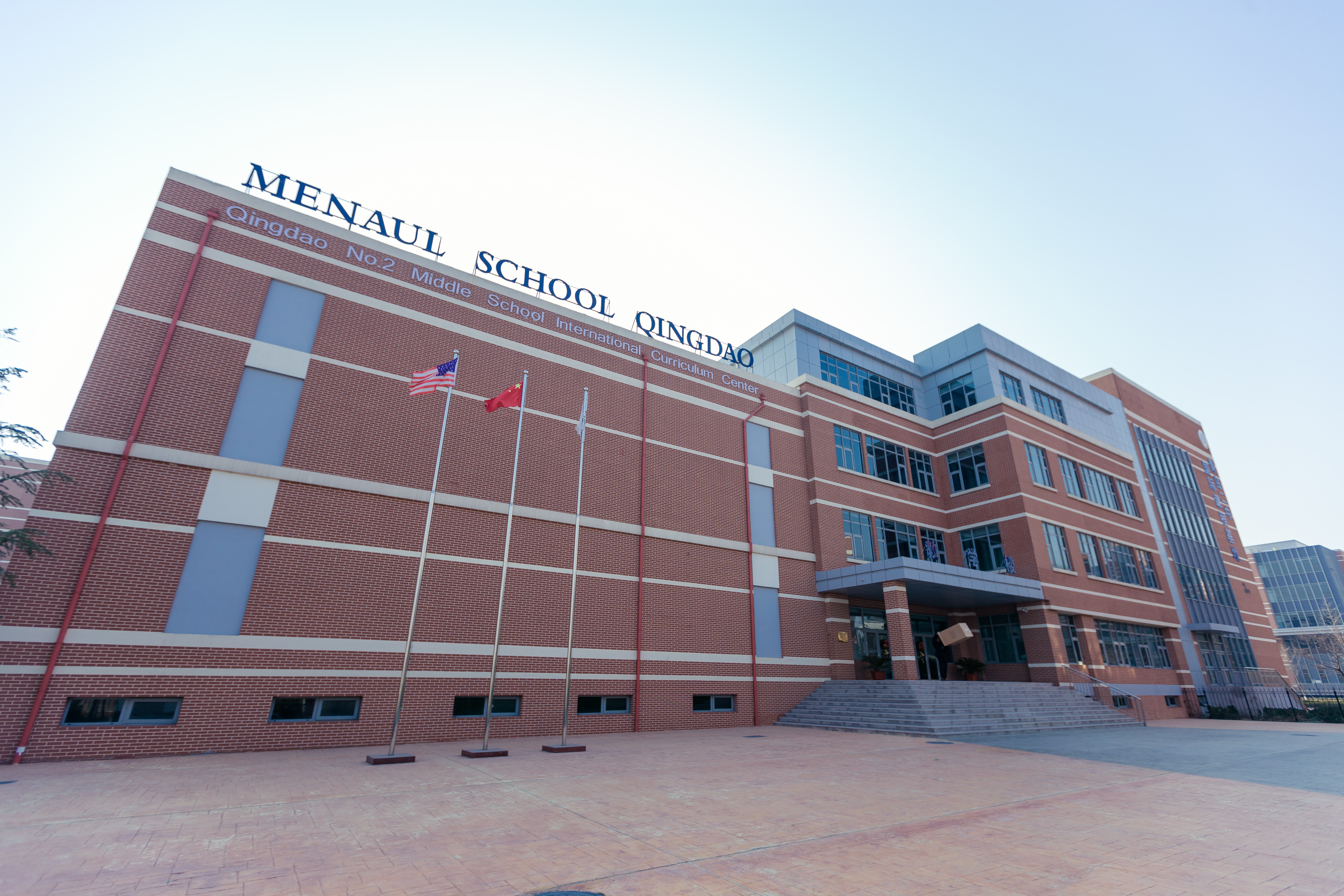
The main building of Menaul School Qingdao

=== Menaul School Qingdao ===
Menaul School is the first school in New Mexico to establish an international branch campus. In September 2018, Menaul School Qingdao was established in Qingdao, Shandong Province, China.

=== LÖWENROT-Gymnasium ===
Since 2019, Menaul School has maintained an active student exchange with the LÖWENROT-Gymnasium, in St. Leon-Rot, Germany. Students from Menaul School are able to participate in exchange trips to Germany and France, and students from Germany visit and attend classes in New Mexico.
