= Gail Smith =

Gail Smith may refer to:

- Gail Smith (classicist), American academic
- Gail Smith (journalist) (born 1955), Canadian television news anchor

== See also ==
- Gayle Smith, American governmental official
- Gayle Smith Wilson (born 1967), American soccer player
