= Gail Smith (classicist) =

American professor

- Born: July 2, 1938
- Died: July 16, 2023 (aged 85)

Academic background
- Education: Montclair State University (BA); Columbia University (MA); New York University (PhD)

Academic work
- Discipline: Classics
- Institutions: Brooklyn College

Gail Smith was a professor of Classics at Brooklyn College, City University of New York.

== Education ==
After a bachelor's degree at Montclair State University, Smith received an MA in Greek and Latin from Columbia University. She then completed a PhD at New York University with a thesis entitled 'The Importance of Miracle to the Religious Faith of Plutarch of Chaeronea' in 1972.

== Career ==
Smith was recruited to the Classics faculty at Brooklyn College by Ethyle Wolfe, then chair of its Classics Department, which she joined in 1972. She was among the inaugural faculty of the CUNY Latin/Greek Institute, in which she continued to teach every few years through 1982.

Smith was appointed to the board of editors for the journal The Classical Outlook in 1974, and also served as acting editor in 1977. In 1993, she published a commentary on Plautus' Captivi as part of the Bryn Mawr Latin Commentaries series. She served as acting chair of the Classics department at Brooklyn College in spring 2010, and as assistant acting provost for CUNY's Graduate Center from 1995 to 2013. As of 2020, Smith continues to teach Latin, ancient Greek literature, and classical reception courses at Brooklyn College, where she has worked for over 40 years.

Smith has been involved in university access schemes since the 1970s, when she was a tutor at the City University of New York's Summer Latin Institute. Between 1991 and 2007, she served as the founding director of the CUNY Pipeline Program, an initiative dedicated to supporting CUNY undergraduates from underrepresented groups who are interested in pursuing a PhD. From 1995 to 2007, she also served as director for the CUNY Graduate Center's Office of Educational Opportunity and Diversity Programs (OEODP, now known as EOD) working to support and increase the number of students from underrepresented groups pursuing PhDs at the university.

Between 1999 and 2013, Smith served as principal investigator for two CUNY programs aiming to widen participation in STEM and social, behavioural and economic science research named the National Institutes of Health/Bridges to the Doctorate Program and the National Science Foundation Alliance for Graduate Education and the Professoriate (AGEP) Program. These programs secured over $11 million in external funding to support their initiatives. She also serves as a Regional Specialist for the Institute for Broadening Participation.

Smith's life and career were celebrated by Brooklyn College at a memorial service on September 13, 2023.

== Publications ==
- (ed.) Plautus, Captivi (1993). Bryn Mawr: Thomas Library, Bryn Mawr College. ISBN 0929524500
