= Menaul Historical Library of the Southwest =

Library in Albuquerque

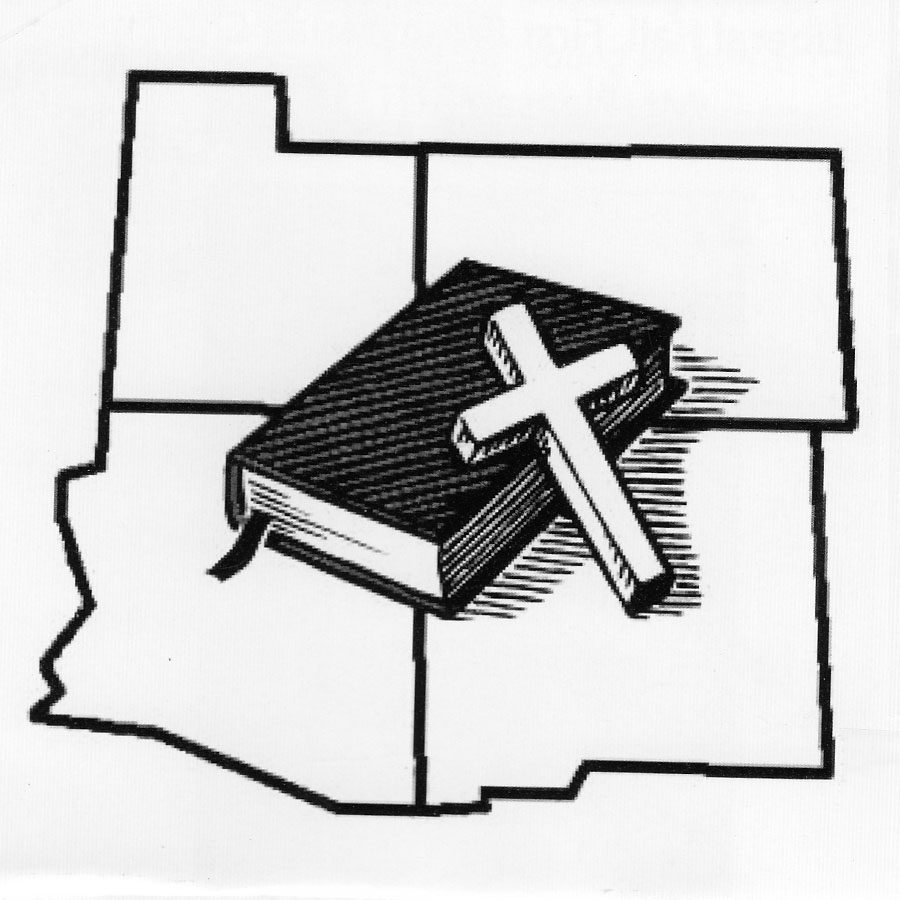

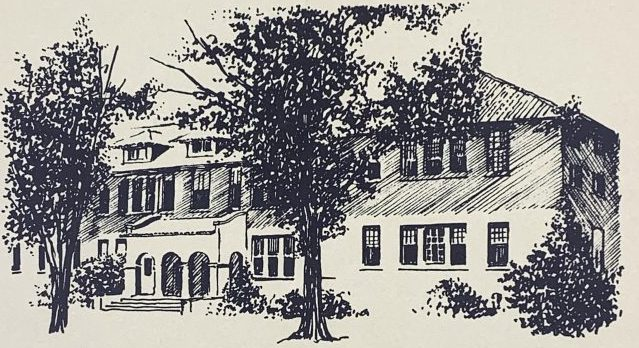
- 35°06′46″N 106°38′16″W
- Location: 301 Menaul Blvd. NE, Albuquerque, Southwest, New Mexico, United States of America, 87107
- Type: Presbyterian Library
- Established: 1974

Collection
- Size: +8,000

Other information
- Director: Maggie Beck
- Affiliation: Synod of the Southwest
- Website: https://menaulhistoricallibrary.org

The Menaul Historical Library of the Southwest (MHL or MHLSW) is located in Allison Hall on the Menaul School campus in Albuquerque, New Mexico, and functions as a repository for records related to the Presbyterian Church in the Southwest, including churches, schools, and medical missions. The library is named for the Reverend James A. Menaul, who worked in the region. The library moved from Bennett Hall to Allison Hall in April 2025, the space having been renovated to serve as a modern research library.

== Collection ==
The library houses more than 8,000 items, including photographs, student records, memorabilia, yearbooks, tapes and transcripts, manuscripts, and personal papers, which document the history of the Presbyterian schools and missions throughout Arizona, Utah, Colorado, and New Mexico. Included in these missions were the foundations of what would become Presbyterian Healthcare Services, many of whose founding documents are maintained at the MHL.

Its collection comprises a variety of materials that are used by researchers from the United States and internationally specializing in Protestant missionary activity and Native American ethnography and linguistics. The archives house over 1,800 folders containing personal letters, official documents, and photographs. The library section contains more than 3,700 books with a significant collection of books and journals detailing the interactions between Protestant missionaries and Native American groups in the Southwest. Additionally, the library holds over 400 objects, including clothing, furniture, musical instruments, and Native American artifacts. The photograph collection includes more than 1,000 historical photographs, negatives, and microfilm.

The library also maintains a collection of yearbooks from Menaul School and the Wasatch Academy dating to 1909, many of which have been digitized and are publicly available.
