= Everett Fly =

American landscape architect

Everett Fly is an American landscape architect based in San Antonio. Fly received the National Humanities Medal by President Barack Obama in 2014.

Fly studied architecture at the University of Texas at Austin (class of 1975) and, in 1977, became the first African American to earn a Master of Landscape Architecture from the Harvard Graduate School of Design.

Fly's clients have included municipal, state, and county governments, and the National Park Service and the National Trust for Historic Preservation. From 1994 to 2001, Fly served on the President's Committee on the Arts and Humanities.
