= Stephen Balch =

American academic (born 1944)

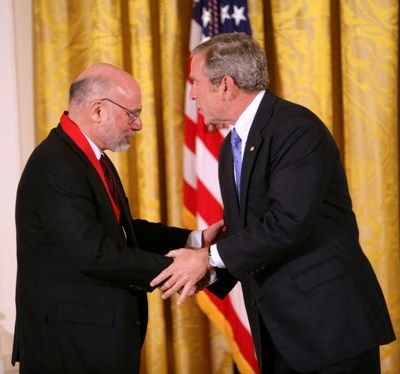
Balch receiving National Humanities Medal from President George W. Bush in November 2007

Stephen H. Balch is an American conservative scholar and higher education reformer. He was the founding president of the National Association of Scholars from 1987 to 2009.

== Early life and education ==
Balch was born on January 31, 1944, into a Jewish family and grew up in Brooklyn, New York City. In 1979, he married Maria Schelz, and they have two children: Leah and Daniel.

Balch received a bachelor's degree, magna cum laude, from Brooklyn College, City University of New York, in 1964. He received his master's degree (1967) and Ph.D. (1972) in political science from the University of California, Berkeley, where his dissertation supervisor was Nelson W. Polsby. It was during the Berkeley riots that he became a conservative. He now identifies as a Republican.

== Career ==
In his early career, Balch held numerous faculty positions. He was instructor of government at the University of San Francisco (1969–1970), acting instructor of political science at the University of California, Berkeley (1970–1971), instructor of political science at Rutgers University–New Brunswick (1971–1972), assistant professor of urban policy and programs at the Office of Urban Policy and Programs in the CUNY Graduate Center (1973–1974), assistant professor and later associate professor of government at John Jay College of Criminal Justice for fourteen years, during which he joined Midge Decter's Committee for the Free World and founded the Campus Coalition for Democracy in 1982.

In 1987, Balch left his academic position and founded the National Association of Scholars (NAS), a membership organization of academic professionals opposed to political correctness in higher education. He served as president of the NAS for twenty-one years between 1987 and 2008, was founder and vice president of the American Academy for Liberal Education (an accrediting agency devoted to enriching content and enhancing the rigor of liberal education), was founder and director of the American Council of Trustees and Alumni (1994–2011), served on the board of trustees for Medaille College in Buffalo, New York (1997–2003), was director of the Philadelphia Society (2002–2006), chairman of the National Association of Scholars from 2009 to 2012, and is currently a member of its steering committee and board (2012–present). NAS now has about 3,000 academic members and forty-seven state affiliates.

Since 2010, Balch has been a board member of the Alexander Hamilton Institute for the Study of Western Civilization. In the fall of 2012, Balch founded the Institute for the Study of Western Civilization at Texas Tech University. He is chairman of the Association for the Study of Free Institutions (2014–present), member of the board of the Alliance for Liberal Learning (2015–present), president of the West Texas/Eastern New Mexico Phi Beta Kappa Association (2016–present), president of Lambda of Texas, Texas Tech University's Phi Beta Kappa Chapter, and member of the board of the American Academy for Liberal Education (2016–present).

As the chief executive officer of the National Association of Scholars (NAS), Balch has received extensive coverage in the national and educational media. He has played a key role in the founding of numerous academic programs at American universities and colleges focused on the study of free institutions and Western civilization.

He is also co-author of several major NAS studies of curriculum evolution and problems, including The Dissolution of General Education: 1914–1993 and Losing the Big Picture: The Fragmentation of the English Major Since 1964. In addition, Balch serves as editor-in-chief of the NAS journal, Academic Questions.

=== Recognition ===
Phi Beta Kappa 1964

American Political Science Association Congressional Fellow, 1972–1973

Danforth Foundation Associate, 1980–1984

Balch received the National Humanities Medal for distinguished service on behalf of the humanities, which was bestowed by President George W. Bush at the White House on November 15, 2007. This award cited him "for leadership and advocacy upholding the noblest traditions in higher education", and went on to say that "his work on behalf of reasoned scholarship in a free society has made him a leading champion of excellence and reform at our nation's universities." On February 27, 2009, Balch also received the Jeane Jordan Kirkpatrick Academic Freedom Award presented by the American Conservative Union Foundation and the Lynde and Harry Bradley Foundation.

Balch served as chairman of the New Jersey State Advisory Committee to the United States Commission on Civil Rights from 1985 to 1990, and was a member of the committee from 1990 to 2005. He was also a member of the National Advisory Board of the United States Department of Education's Fund for the Improvement of Postsecondary Education from 2001 to 2004.

== Bibliography ==
- "Do Strong Presidents Really Want Strong Legislative Parties?" Presidential Studies Quarterly, VII, iv (Fall 1977)
- "Amending the United States Constitution: The View from the States", State Government, LIII, ii (Spring 1980)
- "The Journey Along the Naturalistic-to-Bureaucratic Continuum: Another Route", Politics and the Life Sciences, III, I (August 1984)
- "The Neutered Civil Servant: Eunuchs, Celibates and the Calculus of Organizational Loyalty", The Journal of Social and Biological Structures, VIII, iv (October 1985)
- "The Tenured Left", Commentary (October 1986), with Herbert I. London
- "Marxism and Magic: A Review Essay of Leszek Kolakowski's Main Currents of Marxism: Interpretation" (Spring 1987)
- "Metaevolution and Biocultural History", The Journal of Social and Biological Structures (Fall 1989, pp. 303–318)
- "The Dissolution of General Education: 1914–1993", NAS 1996 (co-authored)
- "The Antidote to Academic Orthodoxy", The Chronicle of Higher Education, April 23, 2004.
- "Presentation: A Canticle for Rothman". Academic Questions. 18 (2): 69–70. March 2005. doi:10.1007/s12129-005-1007-z.
- "Build It and They Will Come: Reviving Academic Diversity through New Programs", Philanthropy, May/June 2005.
- "The Dubious Value of Value-Neutrality", The Chronicle of Higher Education, June 16, 2006.
- "The Route to Academic Pluralism" in The Politically Correct University: Problems, Scope, Reforms (The American Enterprise Institute, 2009) pp. 227–240.
- "The Vanishing West", NAS 2012 (co-authored)
- "On the Fragility of the Western Achievement", Society, January 2014
- Economic and Political Change after Crisis: Prospects for Government, Liberty and the Rule of Law, co-edited with Benjamin Powell (Routledge, 2016)
- "Cognoscendancy: Tyranny of the Talkers", Quadrant, May, 2016
- "Phenocracy; Going off the Genetic Rails", Quadrant, June, 2016
- "For a Concert of the Powers", The American Conservative, October, 2016
- "How Islam Saved the West", Quadrant, October, 2016
- "Race, gender and class : which one doesn't belong?". Quadrant. 62 (1–2 [543]): 54–57. January–February 2018.
