= Fedwa Malti-Douglas =

Lebanese-American professor and writer (born 1946)

- Born: 1946 (age 79–80); Lebanon
- Occupations: professor and writer

Fedwa Malti-Douglas (born 1946) is a Lebanese-American professor and writer. She is a professor emeritus at Indiana University Bloomington. Malti-Douglas has written several books, including The Starr Report Disrobed (2000). She received a National Humanities Medal in 2015.

== Biography ==
Malti-Douglas grew up in Deir el-Qamar, where her father was a physician. Her primary education took place at French Catholic boarding schools and at age 12, she emigrated to the United States. She learned to become fluent in English and when she attended Cornell University, she started taking Semitic languages. Malti-Douglas attended the University of California, Los Angeles and the École des Hautes Études en Sciences Sociales where she did her graduate work in Arabic.

Malti-Douglas received a 1997 Kuwait Prize for Arts and Letters and earned the Distinguished Scholar Award from the Dean of Women's Affairs at Indiana University Bloomington in 1998. In 2004, she was inducted into the American Philosophical Society. Malti-Douglas was awarded a National Humanities Medal in 2015.

Malti-Douglas is a professor emeritus at Indiana University Bloomington and the Martha C. Kraft Professor of Humanities in the College of Arts and Sciences.

== Work ==
Malti-Douglas studied Muslim literary texts from medieval to modern times and wrote about her findings in Woman's Body, Woman's Word: Gender and Discourse in Arabo-Islamic Writing (1991). She describes how women's bodies are increasingly seen as a threat in this literature. Malti-Douglas wrote the second English language examination of the work of Nawal El Saadawi in 1995. The work, Men Women and God(s): Nawal El Saadawi and Arab Feminist Poetics is a "penetrating and admiring analysis of El Saadawi's writing," according to Library Journal. Men, Women and God(s) is also about showing that El Saadawi's work is literature, not just "polemics," as it is often labeled.

In The Starr Report Disrobed (2000), Malti-Douglas deconstructs the issues surrounding the Bill Clinton sex scandal from a feminist perspective. The California Law Review called The Starr Report Disrobed an "insightful and peppy book." The journal also felt that the book highlighted another issue: legal document are no longer just for lawyers and jurists, but have become "salable media content and, ultimately, popular cultural artifacts." The New York Times writes that Malti-Douglas deals with the differences between the facts in the case and the conclusions drawn by prosecutor, Kenneth Starr.

In Medicines of the Soul: Female Bodies and Sacred Geographies in a Transnational Islam (2001), Malti-Douglas gives an analysis of three autobiographies belonging to Muslim women who became more religious. Each of the women she studies have rejected the ideas of the "secular West." Her book examines how men impact and guide the daily lives and even spiritual dreams of Muslim women.

In 2008, Malti-Douglas edited the comprehensive reference book, The Encyclopedia of Sex and Gender, which cover topics about sex and gender through the fields of psychology, sociology, biology, religion and history. Booklist wrote that "Bringing together a remarkable array of material, this set, which appears to be without competition, will no doubt succeed in providing information but also in creating dialogue around issues of sex and gender.
