= Thomas A. Saunders III =

American investment banker (1936–2022)

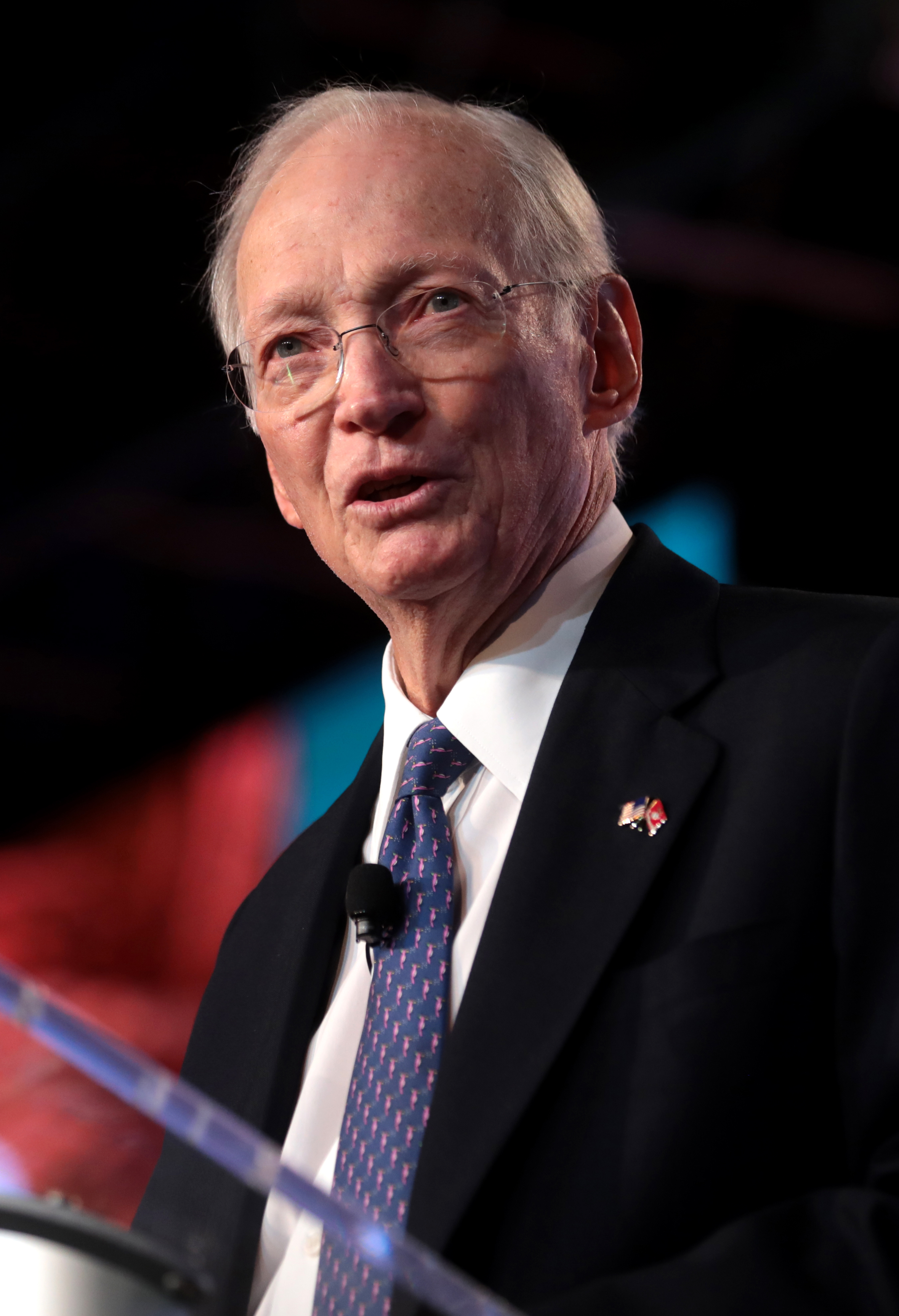
- Born: June 1, 1936; Ivor, Virginia, U.S.
- Died: September 9, 2022 (aged 86); Palm Beach, Florida, U.S.
- Education: Virginia Military Institute (BS); University of Virginia (MBA)
- Known for: Former chairman of the Heritage Foundation, co-founder of Saunders Karp & Megrue, winner of the National Humanities Medal.
- Political party: Republican
- Spouse: Jordan Saunders

Military service
- Allegiance: United States
- Branch/service: United States Army Reserve
- Years of service: 1958–1964
- Rank: Captain

Thomas A. Saunders III (June 1, 1936 – September 9, 2022) was an American investment banker and philanthropist. He was the co-founder of the private equity firm Saunders Karp & Megrue, a winner of the National Humanities Medal and served as the chairman of The Heritage Foundation.

== Early life and military service ==
Saunders graduated from the Virginia Military Institute in 1958, with a B.S. in electrical engineering, and from the University of Virginia's Darden School of Business with an MBA in 1967.

From 1958 to 1964, Saunders served in the United States Army Reserve, attaining the rank of Captain before retiring from the military.

== Career ==
Saunders was a Managing Director of Morgan Stanley from 1974 to August 1989. For ten years he headed the financial services corporation's equity syndications group, developing relations with corporate clients, including DuPont, Eastman Kodak, Exxon, General Motors, and USX. In the early 1980s, Saunders raised $3.8 billion in equity for AT&T in just 18 months. Following the breakup of the Bell System, he headed the advisory team that determined how AT&T would sell its regional subsidiaries. When British Telecommunications was undergoing privatization in 1983, Saunders was appointed as the company's senior U.S. adviser. He was then hired by Conrail president Stanley Crane to determine a privatization plan for the rail company. At Morgan Stanley, Saunders raised $2.2 billion to create a leveraged buyout fund, which he chaired.

Saunders co-founded the private equity firm Saunders Karp & Megrue in 1990. He was a Dollar Tree director since 1993. He has been the president and CEO of Ivor & Co., LLC, a private investment company, since 2000. Saunders also worked briefly for Allis-Chalmers Manufacturing Company. From 1995 to 2016, Saunders was an independent director of Hibbett Sports. He was on the board of directors of Teavana Holdings until it was bought out by Starbucks on December 31, 2012.

== Political activity ==
Saunders was a major donor to the Republican Party. He donated $500,000 to the Republican National Committee and contributed to the campaigns of John McCain, Mitt Romney, and Michele Bachmann.

In April 2009, Saunders was elected chairman of the board of trustees of the conservative think tank The Heritage Foundation. During his tenure, the sister organization Heritage Action for America was founded and Jim DeMint was hired as president.

== Philanthropy ==
Saunders gave the University of Virginia some $17 million during his lifetime. He was chairman of the Thomas Jefferson Foundation's Board of Trustees, and a bridge on the Thomas Jefferson Parkway was named in recognition of a gift from him and his wife. He and his wife endowed the Matthew C. Horner chair in military theory at Marine Corps University. They chaired the 1995 Dinner on the Lawn at UVA, to kick off a billion-dollar capital campaign. In 2007 the Saunders hosted the annual gala for the New-York Historical Society at the Cathedral of St. John the Divine. He and his wife were awarded the National Humanities Medal in 2008.

== Personal life and death ==
Saunders was married to Mary Jordan Saunders (née Horner). They lived in New York City for many years and later moved to Palm Beach, Florida. Together they had one daughter, Calvert Saunders Moore, a son, Thomas A. Saunders IV, and four grandchildren. Saunders was a member of the Wall Street chapter of the Kappa Beta Phi secret society since 1979.

Saunders died on September 9, 2022, at the age of 86.
