= National Association of Scholars =

American advocacy nonprofit interested in education

- Predecessor: Campus Coalition for Democracy
- Formation: 1987; 39 years ago
- Founder: Stephen Balch
- Type: 501(c)(3) organization
- Tax ID no.: 11-2741490
- Headquarters: New York City, New York, U.S.
- Members: Approx. 2,600 (Note: Including both active and associate members.)
- President: Peter Wyatt Wood
- Acting Chairman: Keith Whitaker
- Revenue: $3.98 million (2024)
- Expenses: $2.95 million (2024)
- Website: nas.org

The National Association of Scholars (NAS) is a politically conservative American 501(c)(3) non-profit advocacy organization. It advocates against multiculturalism, diversity policies, and against courses focused on race and gender issues in higher education.

== History and organization ==
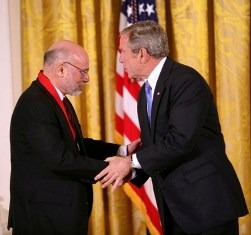
NAS founding president Stephen Balch receiving the National Humanities Medal from President George W. Bush

Originally called the Campus Coalition for Democracy, the National Association of Scholars was founded in 1987 by Herbert London and Stephen Balch with the goal of preserving the "Western intellectual heritage". As of 2021, Peter Wyatt Wood is the president. The advisory board of the NAS has included several notable conservatives, such as Jeane Kirkpatrick, a former United States Ambassador to the United Nations and adviser to Ronald Reagan. Chester Finn helped to form the conservative movement's education policies. According to the association, it has affiliates in 46 U.S. states, as well as in Guam and Canada.

NAS has received funding from politically conservative foundations, including the Sarah Scaife Foundation, the John M. Olin Foundation, the Bradley Foundation, the Castle Rock Foundation, the Smith Richardson Foundation, and the Arthur N. Rupe Foundation.

== Positions and activities ==
The NAS engaged the American Association of University Professors over its diversity standard, and complained to the secretary of the U.S. Department of Education, Lamar Alexander, who ruled that the Middle States Association of Colleges and Schools must eliminate it. Academics studying the group have described NAS as "conservative", a "group of reactionary scholars" and "a leading vehicle for the conservative attack on multiculturalism and political correctness." Jacob Weisberg stated in 1991 that NAS is "prone to conflating its admirable ideals with far less compelling political prejudices."

Chapters of the NAS have been involved in a number of campus controversies related to affirmative action and multicultural studies programs. According to People for the American Way, NAS faculty at the University of Texas, Austin blocked the inclusion of civil rights readings in an English course; the readings had been proposed to address concerns about racial and sexual harassment on campus. In 1990, the NAS placed an advertisement in the Daily Texan (the University of Texas student newspaper), calling for the rejection of a proposed multiculturalism curriculum at the University of Texas. Simultaneously, the NAS encouraged a successful campaign to defund the university's Chicano newspaper. Time magazine in 1991 described NAS as "the cutting edge of faculty opposition to the excesses of multiculturalism and the replacement of traditional curriculums with courses about race and gender issues."

In 1990, a Duke University chapter of the NAS was formed by political science professor James David Barber. The new chapter provoked "a sometimes bitter debate" about the NAS stances on race and gender, and on whether academic freedom should extend to what NAS critics viewed as intolerance. Stanley Fish, chairman of the English department at Duke, wrote that NAS "is widely known to be racist, sexist and homophobic." In an interview with the Durham Morning Herald, Barber called Fish "an embarrassment to this university for his gross insult to this organization". In response to the NAS chapter formation, a larger group of faculty formed "Duke Faculty for Academic Tolerance".

Also in 1990, the Harvard University community debated the presence of the NAS. Writing in the Harvard Crimson, Martin L. Kilson Jr. acknowledged some "overzealous behavior by supporters of ethnic studies and women studies" but argued that the NAS was an "overkill neoconservative response". In Kilson's view, NAS had succumbed to "anxiety and maybe phobia" of multiculturalism. He asks, "Why shouldn't persons on our campuses go to great lengths to avoid the tag 'racist'? Or the tags 'homophobic', 'sexist', 'anti-Asian', etc.?"

In 2001, it was reported that the Colorado Commission on Higher Education had paid the National Association of Scholars $25,000 to generate a report on several Colorado universities with education programs. The NAS report criticized diversity curricula and recommended that the University of Colorado's education program be suspended and new admissions to other programs be halted. University of Colorado, Boulder dean William Stanley resigned in protest of what he called "teacher-bashing" by the NAS, while regent Bob Sievers deplored "anti-teaching, anti-C.U./Boulder, anti-women and anti-minority bias". Questions were also raised regarding why money was paid to a "right-wing" organization like the NAS rather than to a group "with credentials in teacher education".

In September 2008, The New York Times described the NAS as among the politically conservative organizations intensively and successfully lobbying for federal funding for programs which emphasize "traditional American history, free institutions or Western civilization". The Times reported that NAS and allied organizations sought to advance conservative causes by attaching conditions to university donations.

In January 2013 the Center for the Study of the Curriculum, along with NAS's affiliate the Texas Association of Scholars, released a report, Recasting History, on U.S. history courses taught in the Fall 2010 semester at the University of Texas and Texas A&M University, which criticized the weight that the courses gave to race, class, or gender. After the report's release, Jeremi Suri, the Mack Brown Distinguished Professor for Global Leadership, History, and Public Policy at UT-Austin, called the report "misleading, and frankly dumb". Writing in The Alcalde, the official alumni magazine, Suri defended the University of Texas's course offerings, saying, "What we are teaching at UT, in almost all of our history and related courses, is a plural history of how many different people and parts of America relate to one another. What we are teaching is the beauty, the color, the promise, and also the challenge of contemporary America."

From 2011-2013, Thomas Klingenstein commissioned NAS to investigate Bowdoin College, which they called "The Bowdoin Project". It was directed by Peter Wyatt Wood, researched by Michael Toscano, funded by Klingenstein, and cost over $100,000 (equivalent to $138,214 in 2025). This project produced a series of 13 preliminary reports, and culminated in an April 2013 report, What Does Bowdoin Teach? How a Contemporary Liberal Arts College Shapes Students. The report criticized Bowdoin College in Brunswick, Maine for employing too few conservatives, as well as for its endorsements of multiculturalism and sustainability, and for its anti-hazing rules. The project was part of an ongoing feud between funder Klingenstein and Bowdoin president Barry Mills. Mills called the report "mean-spirited and personal".

NAS is a member of the advisory board of Project 2025, a collection of conservative and right-wing policy proposals from the Heritage Foundation to reshape the United States federal government and consolidate executive power should the Republican nominee win the 2024 presidential election.

== Academic Questions ==
Academic Questions
- Discipline: Higher education
- Language: English
- Edited by: Peter Wood

Publication details
- History: 1987–present
- Publisher: Springer Science+Business Media on behalf of the National Association of Scholars
- Frequency: Quarterly

Standard abbreviations
- ISO 4: Acad. Quest.

Indexing
- CODEN: ACQUEO
- ISSN: 0895-4852 (print); 1936-4709 (web)
- LCCN: 88649846
- OCLC no.: 260176958

Links
- Journal homepage; Online access

The NAS publishes a quarterly journal, Academic Questions. It features articles and interviews on higher education, with a focus on examining issues that arise from the interplay among politics, ideology, scholarship, and teaching in higher education.
