= Arturo Madrid =

American scholar of Hispanic studies

- Born: Tierra Amarilla, New Mexico
- Education: University of New Mexico; University of California, Los Angeles
- Occupations: Author and professor
- Notable work: In the Country of Empty Crosses (2012)
- Awards: National Humanities Medal

Arturo Madrid is an American academic known for his contributions to Hispanic studies and advocacy for Latino representation in academia. He received the Charles Frankel Prize, later renamed the National Humanities Medal in 1996.

== Early life and education ==
Arturo Madrid was born in Tierra Amarilla, New Mexico. He attended Menaul School, a Presbyterian boarding school in Albuquerque. Madrid earned a Bachelor of Arts from the University of New Mexico and later obtained both a Master of Arts and Ph.D. in Hispanic languages and literature from the UCLA.

== Academic career ==
Madrid began his academic career at Dartmouth College and subsequently held positions at the University of California, San Diego and the University of Minnesota, where he served as dean of the College of Liberal Arts. In 1993, he joined Trinity University in San Antonio, Texas, as the Norine R. and T. Frank Murchison Distinguished Professor of the Humanities. At Trinity, Madrid also directed the "Mexico, the Americas, and Spain" program.

== Contributions and notable work ==
Madrid founded the Tomás Rivera Center, a national research center dedicated to Latino policy studies. His work primarily addresses Hispanic literature, culture, and identity within the United States.

== Publications ==
- In the Country of Empty Crosses: The Story of a Hispano Protestant Family in Catholic New Mexico
- "Of Heretics and Interlopers" in A Companion to Latina/o Studies, edited by Juan Flores and Renato Rosaldo
- "Off-White: The Conflictive Racial Identity of Mexican Americans," published in the San Antonio Express-News

== Awards and recognition ==
Madrid received the Charles Frankel Prize (later known as the National Humanities Medal) in 1996 for his contributions to the humanities and his exemplification of the integration of scholarship and public service. In 2009, he received the John Hope Franklin Award.

== Influence and impact ==
Madrid's advocacy significantly impacted Latino representation in higher education, promoting increased visibility and research on Latino issues. His leadership has supported Latino scholars and artists across the nation.
