= Albert H. Small =

American philanthropist (1925–2021)

- Born: October 15, 1925; Washington, D.C., U.S.
- Died: October 3, 2021 (aged 95); Rockville, Maryland, U.S.
- Occupation: Real estate developer
- Children: Albert H. Small Jr.
- Parent: Albert Small

Albert H. Small (October 15, 1925 – October 3, 2021) was an American real estate developer and philanthropist.

== Early life and education ==
Born to a Jewish family, Small was of the second generation of a family involved in real estate development in the Washington D.C. metropolitan area. Small's paternal grandparents were Isadore Small, an immigrant from Poznań in Poland, and Sarah Rappaport Small, who was born in Boston and later lived in Portland, Maine. Isadore Small arrived in Washington, D.C. in the 1880s, after having lived in Charleston, South Carolina upon first immigrating. Isadore was one of the founding members of Sixth & I Historic Synagogue, then a Conservative synagogue. The Small family did not observe kashrut, as they were not Orthodox. The Smalls observed the Passover Seder and the High Holy Days, but did not observe other Jewish holidays. Albert H. Small's father Albert was a commercial developer who built the Silver Spring Shopping Center in 1938, the first drive-in shopping center in the area. Albert H. expanded into apartment and commercial development. In 1950, he founded Southern Engineering with Hermen Greenberg and eventually built more than 20,000 buildings throughout the region. He graduated from the University of Virginia in chemical engineering in 1946.

His son, Albert Small Jr., has followed in the family business and is involved in residential homebuilding mainly in Northern Virginia.

== Career ==
Prior to the passage of the 1968 Fair Housing Act, Small used racially restrictive covenants to exclude African Americans and other racial minorities from neighborhoods he helped develop.

Small served as a Director of Home Properties of New York Inc. from July 1999 until May 4, 2004. Along with the acquisition of properties near Washington, D.C., he and others received approximately 4,086,000 of operating partnership units in Home Properties. He was President of Southern Engineering Corporation and was a member of the Urban Land Institute and the National Association of Home Builders.

He invested with Bernie Madoff.

== Philanthropy ==
Small served on the board of directors of the National Symphony Orchestra, National Advisory Board Music Associates of Aspen, Department of State Diplomatic Rooms Endowment Fund, James Madison Council of the Library of Congress, Tudor Place Foundation, The Life Guard of Mount Vernon, Historical Society of Washington, D.C., and the National Archives Foundation.

The University of Virginia Library and the Smithsonian National Museum of American History have named rooms for him. The Albert H. Small Declaration of Independence Collection in the University of Virginia Library is the most comprehensive in the world about the document. Small pledged his entire collection to the University, along with substantial funds for the new building. He has given to Tulane University. Small has a special affinity for those who died during World War II, and whose stories are "forgotten" as time passes. For the past two years, he has paid for a team of fifteen teachers and their student partners to come to Washington D.C. as part of Project Normandy: Sacrifice for Freedom This institute is affiliated with The George Washington University Department of History. Students and teachers research a soldier from their home state who is buried at the American Cemetery in Normandy, France. The teams then travel to France and tour the D-Day battlefields, where they lay a wreath at the graveside and read a memorial to their soldier. After they return home, students produce a web page devoted to that soldier.

== Awards ==
- 2009 National Humanities Medal
