= Edith Kurzweil =

American writer and editor (1924–2016)

Edith Kurzweil (born 1924 Vienna - died February 6, 2016 New York City) was an American writer, and editor of Partisan Review. In 1995, she married William Phillips. Born in Vienna, she emigrated to the United States in 1940 after the Anschluss. Later in life, she graduated with a Ph.D. in sociology from The New School for Social Research. She taught at Rutgers University.

== Awards ==
- 1982 Rockefeller Humanities Fellowship
- 1987 National Endowment for the Humanities Fellowship
- 2003 National Humanities Medal

== Works ==
- Italian entrepreneurs: rearguard of progress. Praeger. 1983. ISBN 978-0-03-061709-6.
- The age of structuralism: from Lévi-Strauss to Foucault. Transaction Publishers. 1996. ISBN 978-1-56000-879-8.
- The Freudians: a comparative perspective. Transaction Publishers. 1997. ISBN 978-1-56000-956-6.
- Darlene M. Juschka, ed. (2001). "Feminists and Freudians". Feminism in the study of religion: a reader. Continuum International Publishing Group. ISBN 978-0-8264-4727-2.
- Full circle: a memoir. Transaction Publishers. 2007. ISBN 978-1-4128-0662-6.

=== Editor ===
- Edith Kurzweil; William Phillips, eds. (1983). Writers & politics: a Partisan review reader. Routledge. ISBN 978-0-7100-9316-5.
- Edith Kurzweil, ed. (1996). A partisan century: political writings from Partisan review. Columbia University Press. ISBN 978-0-231-10331-2.
- Malvine Fischer (2004). Edith Kurzweil (ed.). Nazi laws and Jewish lives: letters from Vienna. Transaction Publishers. ISBN 978-0-7658-0246-0.
