= Ramón Saldívar =

Mexican-American author and professor (born 1949)

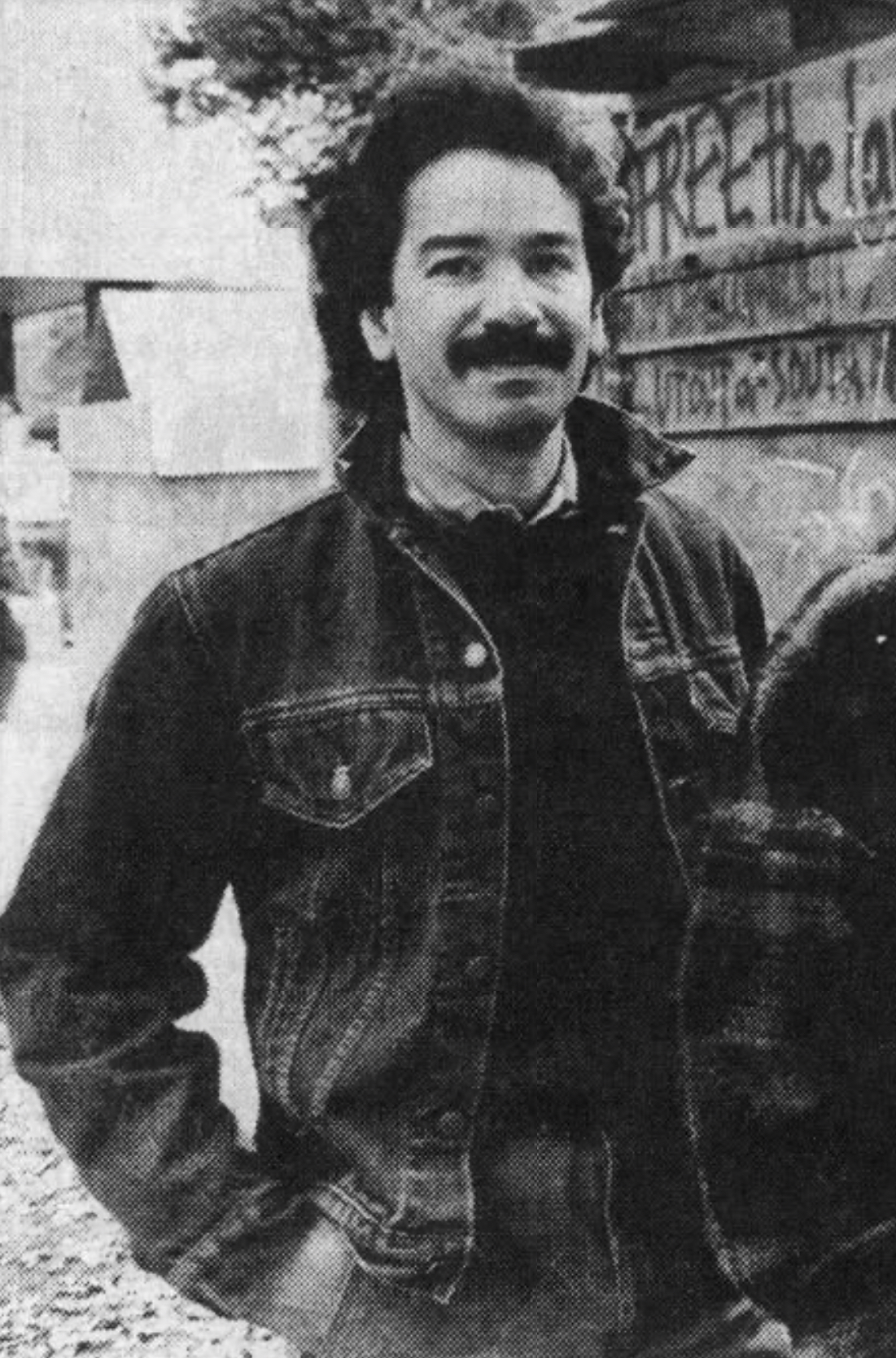
Saldívar as professor of literature at the University of Texas at Austin, February 1988

Ramón Saldívar (born 1949) is an American author, teacher and researcher of cultural studies and Chicano literature. He is currently a professor at Stanford University, and received the National Humanities Medal from President Barack Obama in 2012.

== Biography ==
=== Early life and education ===
Saldívar grew up in Brownsville, Texas, a town on the Mexico-United States border. Saldívar said in an interview that "From downtown Brownsville, you can literally look across the river and, a hundred yards away or so, there's Mexico. To me, growing up, that was always normal life, that was the way the world worked: bilingual, binational, transcultural in all sorts of ways." He was raised in a Spanish speaking household, learning English only after entering school.

He graduated from Brownsville High School in 1968, and pursued undergraduate studies at the University of Texas, Austin. Saldívar briefly considered a career in law or a return to Texas' Rio Grande Valley, but ultimately earned a degree in comparative literature and graduated with highest honors, and a membership in Phi Beta Kappa society. He went on to earn a Master of Philosophy from Yale University in 1975 and a Ph.D two years later.

=== Career at Stanford ===
After graduating from Yale, Saldívar spent 15 years teaching at UT Austin before accepting a position at Stanford in 1991. He has been a professor of English and Comparative Literature there for the past 22 years. Saldívar acted as Stanford's Associate Dean and Vice-Provost for Undergraduate Studies from 1994 to 1999, and worked as a Milligan Family University Fellow in Undergraduate Education from 2002 to 2012. He is currently the director of Stanford's Center for Comparative Studies in Race and Ethnicity. Saldívar's lectures cover topics in literary criticism and theory, the history of the novel, 19th and 20th-century literature, cultural studies, globalization and transnationalism, and Chicano/a studies.

In February 2012, Saldívar was one of nine scholars honored with a National Humanities Medal by United States President Barack Obama. After receiving the medal, Saldívar said he was both "completely blown away and deeply moved by the honor."

=== Books ===
Saldívar has written three books, the first of which, Figural Language in the Novel: The Flowers of Speech from Cervantes to Joyce, was published in 1984. In Figural Language in the Novel, Saldívar analyzes the processes by which narratives establish the grammar and syntax necessary for the expression of a particular meaning unique to that story.

Saldívar's second book, Chicano Narrative: The Dialectics of Difference, was released in 1990 and focused on the struggle of Mexican-American authors to maintain cultural identity throughout the 19th and 20th centuries, a struggle which the author felt had been neglected in the study of American literature.

His most recent book, The Borderlands of Culture: Américo Paredes and the Transnational Imaginary, focuses on Mexican-American scholar Américo Paredes and his contributions to the discourse of cultural studies in the U.S. Saldívar details a history of Paredes' career in writing about the American southwestern borderlands, and presents Paredes as being among the founders of a new kind of cultural studies in America concerned with the Mexico-United States border and its social and historical significance. The book was published by Duke University Press in 2006, seven years after Paredes died.

== Theories and criticism ==
Saldívar points out that unlike most ethnic immigrants in the United States, Mexican Americans became an ethnic minority through the direct conquest of their homelands. This change in legal status resulted in the slow development of a unique culture that was distinct from both Mexican and mainstream American Culture.

A focus of Saldívar's work is the idea that Chicano literature has been relegated to ethnic studies more than it deserves. Saldívar believes that it should instead be considered American literature. "Works by Mexican-American authors are absent from the American literary histories, the anthologies of American literature, and from the syllabi of courses on American literature. Spanish departments in American universities have also participated in this strategy of exclusion," he says. "This exclusion is by no means innocent."

Much of that theory, presented in his book Chicano Narrative, has been met with support from other academics. Maria A. Beltran states in Vocal and American Literature that "Saldívar provides the reader with a more modern, challenging, and sophisticated critical view of Mexican-American literature." "His aim is to educate Hispanic and non-Hispanic educators and scholars. His book may shock those who still deny that Chicano literature must be included in the teaching of Hispanic and American literature in U.S. colleges and universities, for he strives to demonstrate that, through their works, Chicano authors represent and are part of an American reality that can no longer be ignored." Hector A. Torres of College Literature called Chicano Narrative "a monumental work on the scene of Chicano/a literary criticism."

José E. Limón, in American Literary History, criticized Saldívar's philosophy of Chicano/American integration and the existence of a defined dialectic, that Saldívar described in The Borderlands of Culture "Saldívar seems too determined to create such a substantial East–West, truly transnational Duboisian figure in Paredes when the available evidence would seem rather to suggest a Mexican-American intellectual of high achievement in two relatively discrete spheres," he writes.

== Personal life ==
Saldívar has seven siblings, two of which have also gone on to become professors of literature. His brother, José, teaches at Stanford and his sister Sonia Saldívar-Hull teaches at the University of Texas San Antonio. Saldívar has said that Walt Whitman is his favorite poet, and believes that the contradictions and multitudes he presents in his poetry are similar to the themes used in Chicano literature. Saldívar grew up a self-proclaimed fan of Davy Crockett, but was conflicted when he found out that his hero fought against Mexican forces.
