= Pauline Schultz =

American archivist and writer

Pauline L. Schultz (June 7, 1915 – October 30, 2011) was an American archivist and writer on Wyoming history. She also founded the Salt Creek Oil Field Museum in 1980.

Schultz received one of the 2007 National Humanities Medals. The award cited her for "stewardship of a precious trove of local historical knowledge. She has been a collector and curator of facts and artifacts that capture a century of human experience on Wyoming's high plains." She died in October 2011 at the age of 96.
