= Peter W. Wood =

Anthropologist

Peter Wyatt Wood (born 1953) is an American anthropologist and author. He is president of the National Association of Scholars, having been appointed to that office in 2009. Wood was previously tenured as a professor of anthropology at Boston University, where he also served as Associate Provost and Chief of Staff to the President.

As of 2022, Wood is a National Review columnist, commenting on higher education and other topics. He is also a critic of diversity, equity, and inclusion practices.

Wood is a graduate of Haverford College, Rutgers University, and the University of Rochester, where he received a PhD in anthropology in 1987.

== Publications ==
=== Books (selected) ===
- Wood, Peter Wyatt (1986). Quoting Heaven: Narrative, Ritual, and Trope in an Heretical Shrine of the Virgin Mary in Rural Wisconsin. University of Rochester. Department of Anthropology.
- Wood, Peter (2003). Diversity: The Invention of a Concept. Encounter Books. ISBN 978-1-893554-62-7.
- Wood, Peter (2006). A Bee in the Mouth: Anger in America Now. Encounter Books. ISBN 978-1-59403-053-6.
- Wood, Peter (2015). Drilling Through the Core: Why Common Core Is Bad for American Education. Pioneer Institute. ISBN 978-0-9852086-9-1.
- Wood, Peter (2016). The Architecture of Intellectual Freedom. National Association of Scholars. ISBN 978-0-9975211-4-6.
- Wood, Peter W. (2020). Diversity Rules. Encounter Books. ISBN 978-1-64177-112-2.
- Wood, Peter W. (2020). 1620: A Critical Response to the 1619 Project. Encounter Books. ISBN 978-1-64177-125-2.
- Wood, Peter W. (2021). Wrath: America Enraged. Encounter Books. ISBN 978-1-64177-219-8.
