= Nickolas Davatzes =

American television executive (1942–2021)

Nickolas Davatzes (March 14, 1942 – August 21, 2021) was an American television executive who was CEO Emeritus of A&E Networks. He created and developed two cable television networks: A&E and The History Channel. A&E was formed in 1983 through the merger of ABC and Hearst's ARTS Network and NBC's Entertainment Channel, creating a partnership as unlikely as it has been successful.

== Career ==
The son of Greek immigrants, Davatzes was born and raised in New York City, and graduated from St. John's University, from which he received an honorary Ph.D. After 12 years with Xerox he was recruited to work for Gus Hauser at Warner Amex, which owned cable systems and programming services and where MTV and Nickelodeon were created. At Warner Amex Davatzes learned the basics of the cable business and helped develop some of the innovative cable systems that the company built in cities such as Dallas. He was given the experience of working with franchising, programming and building and running the interactive QUBE systems. He also touched on the activities of some of his colleagues such as Dick Aurelio and Larry Wangberg.

In 1983 he was recruited to run a merger between two failed cable networks: the Entertainment Network, owned by RCA and the Rockefeller family and the ARTS Network, owned by Hearst and ABC. Out of the wreckage of these he built the A&E Network, taking it to profitability in three years. Through the years he obtained distribution, product and establishing an identity for the new network with such hits as the Biography series, the Hornblower series, 100 Centre Street and A Nero Wolfe Mystery. In 1995 A&E launched a second network, The History Channel, which also proved to be a quick success with viewers and advertisers. Davatzes was also involved in many of the legislative battles the cable industry fought in Washington over the years.

Davatzes has been able to handle special issues attached to running a business owned by different partners for more than 17 years and has managed to keep all parties involved and satisfied. This has resulted in this team becoming the longest-running executive team in the television business. In recent years the cable company has also developed additional successful programming, including the Biography Channel, History Channel International and History Channel en Español.

To most observers, Nick appeared quiet and low-key, but he was passionate about his work and about social causes, especially education and job opportunities. He served on the board of St. John's University, whose mission is to educate the children of the poor. Forty percent of students there, he said, are from homes with an income of less than $30,000 annually. "We need more institutions like that," he believed.

The History Channel has created a resource website for history teachers.

== Personal life ==
Davatzes grew up the son of Greek immigrants, on Eighth Avenue and 19th Street in New York's Chelsea district long before it was fashionable to live there. His apartment building had no central heating and had a bar on the first floor. He attended P.S. 11 Elementary School on 20th Street and Bryant High School in Astoria, Queens.

Davatzes had been married for 53 years to his wife, Dorie. They have two sons – one a professor of structural geology at Temple University and the other a financial executive at GE Capital. The son of immigrants, a United States Marine Corps veteran, whose father served in both the Greek and U.S. armies, He was the recipient of the Marine Corps Heritage Foundation's Heritage Award for his support to the foundation. He received a National Humanities Medal from President George W. Bush and was admitted to the Phi Kappa Tau Hall of Fame in 2006. In October 2005, the Cable Center inducted Mr. Davatzes into the Cable Television Hall of Fame Class of 2005 honoring his significant contributions to the cable telecommunications industry. In June 2003, Davatzes received the 2003 Vanguard Award for Distinguished Leadership from the National Cable Television Association.

Davatzes died on August 21, 2021, at his home in Wilton, Connecticut.
