= Ramón Eduardo Ruiz =

American historian (1921–2010)

Ramón Eduardo Ruiz (September 9, 1921 – July 6, 2010) was an American historian of Mexico and Latin America. He was the author of fifteen books on Mexican and Latin American history and in 1998 he was awarded the US National Humanities Medal.

Ruiz was born in San Diego, California as the son of a former member of the Mexican Navy who left that country during the Mexican Revolution. He served as a Pacific B-29 pilot in the Army Air Forces during World War II. He earned his bachelor's degree from San Diego State University in 1947, his master's from Claremont Graduate University in 1948, and his doctorate from the University of California, Berkeley in 1954. Ruiz taught at the University of Oregon, Smith College, and the University of California, San Diego.

Born a US citizen, to a Mexican family living and working in the United States. He was very proud of his religion which made him take more interest in wanting to know about the Mexican border. He is the author of 15 books giving knowledge about Mexico and Latin America. When he released the Mexican Revolution in 1980 he caused a controversial issues standing at writing in the new republic it was the first statement by an American historian of Mexico that the real revolution was not a triumph of the people at large, but a long violent specifically bourgeois reform which crushed other populist revolts for the sake of better business. He also brought up the issue of the border such as the North American Free trade agreement and lurid accounts of Mexican drugs lords, killings, and political corruption. Ruiz argued the exchange of goods and services drove the dynamics of border economics. Ramon was a civic and community activist, he was one of the early protestors of the Vietnam war and supported the late chicano leader, Cesar Chavez, in his efforts improve the lives and welfare of migrant farm workers.
