= Ethyle R. Wolfe =

Ethyle Renee Wolfe (March 4, 1919 – May 6, 2010) was an American classics professor who taught at Brooklyn College. During her many years at the college, she developed the Humanities Institute (now named after her) and was awarded the Charles Frankel Prize in 1990.

== Biography ==
Wolfe was born on March 4, 1919, in Burlington, Vermont. She went to the University of Vermont (UVM) where she graduated with a bachelor's degree in 1940 and two years later, with a master's degree. Afterwards, she went to Bryn Mawr College where she studied with T.R.S. Broughton, Lily Ross Taylor and Richmond Lattimore, though she did not earn a degree.

Wolfe started working at Brooklyn College as a lecturer in 1947. She earned her Ph.D. from New York University (NYU) in 1950. After earning her doctorate, she was promoted to assistant professor at Brooklyn College. In 1967, she was made the chair of the department of Classics and Comparative Literature. From 1965 to 1971, she was the associate editor for Classical World. Wolfe was involved in the creation of the Humanities institute and the CUNY Latin/Greek Institute at Brooklyn College in the 1970s.

In 1982, she became a provost and vice president of academic affairs at Brooklyn College. When Wolfe retired from Brooklyn College, the humanities institute there was named the Ethyle R. Wolfe Humanities Institute in her honor. In 1990, she was one of the winners of the Charles Frankel Prize given by the National Endowment for the Humanities. Wolfe died on May 6, 2010.
