= National Humanities Medal =

American award for contributions to Humanities

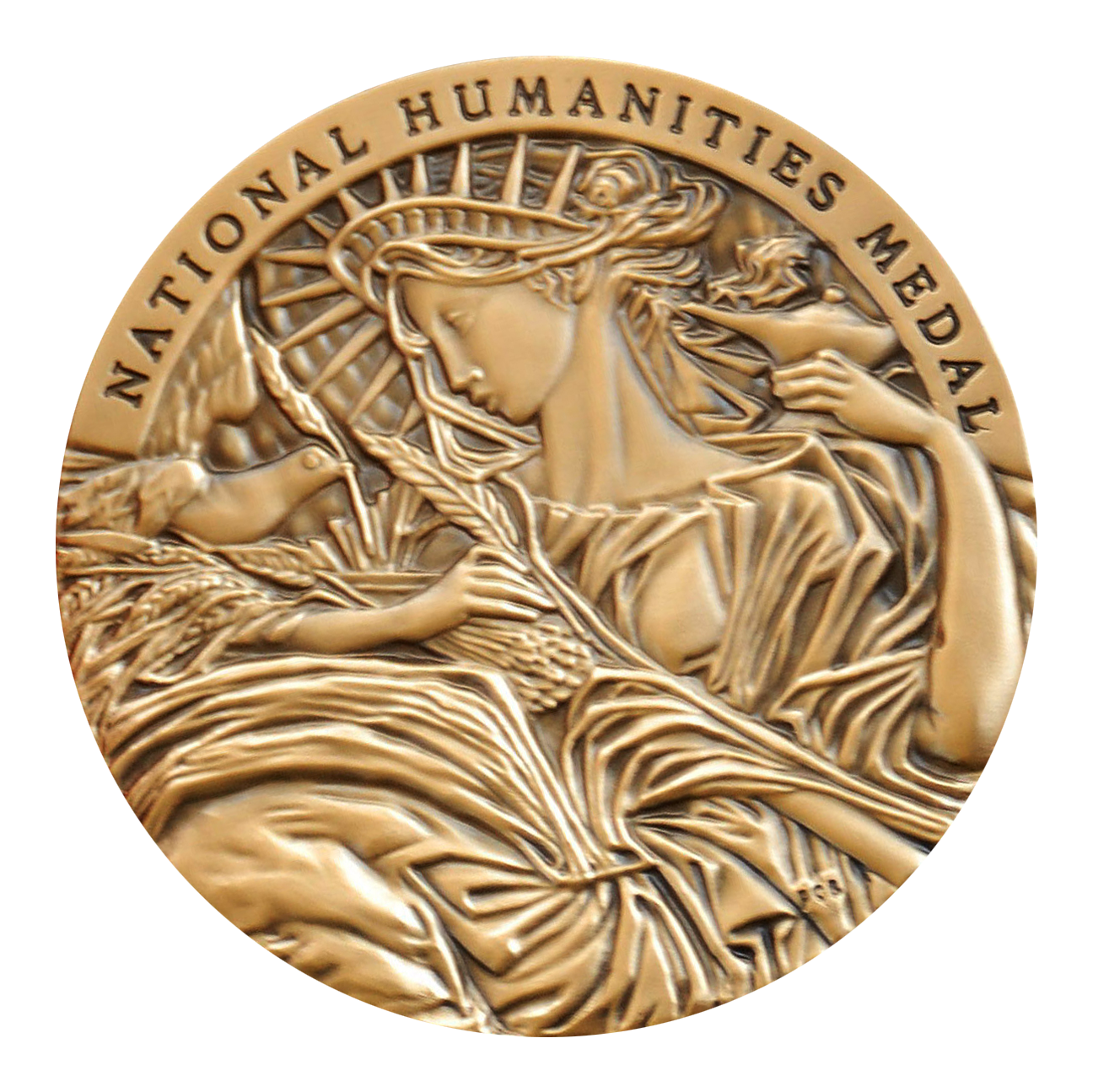
- Awarded for: Exceptional Contributions in the Humanities
- Location: Washington, D.C.
- Country: United States
- Presented by: President of the United States
- First award: 1997
- Website: https://www.neh.gov/taxonomy/term/246
- Ribbon of the medal

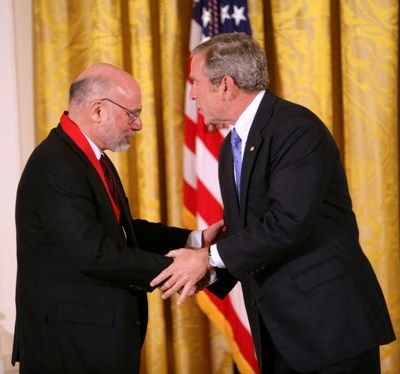
Stephen Balch, founding president of the National Association of Scholars, receives the National Humanities Medal from U.S. president George W. Bush on November 15, 2007.

The National Humanities Medal is an American award that annually recognizes several individuals, groups, or institutions for work that has "deepened the nation's understanding of the humanities, broadened our citizens' engagement with the humanities, or helped preserve and expand Americans' access to important resources in the humanities".

The annual Charles Frankel Prize in the Humanities was established in 1988 and succeeded by the National Humanities Medal in 1997. The token is a bronze medal designed by a 1995 Frankel Prize winner, David Macaulay.

Medals are conferred annually, usually by the U.S. president, to as many as twelve living candidates and existing organizations nominated early in the calendar year. The president selects the winners in consultation with the National Endowment for the Humanities (NEH). NEH asks that nominators consult the list of previous winners and consider the National Medal of Arts to recognize contributions in "the creative or performing arts".

== Recipients ==
Medalists are listed by year, then alphabetically by surname.

=== The Charles Frankel Prize ===
1989

- Patricia L. Bates
- Daniel Boorstin
- Willard L. Boyd
- Clay Jenkinson
- Américo Paredes

1990

- Mortimer Adler
- Henry Hampton
- Bernard Knox
- David Van Tassel
- Ethyle R. Wolfe

1991

- Winton Blount
- Ken Burns
- Louise Cowan
- Karl Haas
- John Tchen

1992

- Allan Bloom
- Shelby Foote
- Richard Rodriguez
- Harold K. Skramstad, Jr.
- Eudora Welty

1993

- Ricardo Alegría
- John Hope Franklin
- Hanna Gray
- Andrew Heiskell
- Laurel T. Ulrich

1994

- Ernest L. Boyer
- William Kittredge
- Peggy Whitman Prenshaw
- Sharon Percy Rockefeller
- Dorothy Porter Wesley

1995

- William R. Ferris
- Charles Kuralt
- David Macaulay
- David McCullough
- Bernice Johnson Reagon

1996

- Rita Dove
- Doris Kearns Goodwin
- Daniel Kemmis
- Arturo Madrid
- Bill Moyers

=== The National Humanities Medal ===
1997

- Nina M. Archabal
- David A. Berry
- Richard J. Franke
- William Friday
- Don Henley
- Maxine Hong Kingston
- Luis Leal
- Martin Marty
- Paul Mellon

1998

- Stephen E. Ambrose
- E. L. Doctorow
- Diana L. Eck
- Nancye Brown Gaj
- Henry Louis Gates, Jr.
- Vartan Gregorian
- Ramón Eduardo Ruiz
- Arthur M. Schlesinger, Jr.
- Studs Terkel
- Garry Wills

1999

- Patricia Battin
- Taylor Branch
- Jacquelyn Dowd Hall
- Garrison Keillor
- Jim Lehrer
- John Rawls
- Steven Spielberg
- August Wilson

2000

- Robert N. Bellah
- Will Campbell
- Judy Crichton
- David C. Driskell
- Ernest Gaines
- Herman T. Guerrero
- Quincy Jones
- Barbara Kingsolver
- Edmund Morgan
- Toni Morrison
- Earl Shorris
- Virginia Driving Hawk Sneve

2001

- José Cisneros
- Robert Coles
- Sharon Darling
- William Manchester
- Richard Peck
- Eileen Jackson Southern
- Tom Wolfe
- National Trust for Historic Preservation

2002

- Frankie Hewitt
- Iowa Writers' Workshop
- Donald Kagan
- Brian Lamb
- Art Linkletter
- Thomas Sowell
- Patricia MacLachlan
- The Mount Vernon Ladies' Association

2003

- Robert Ballard
- Joan Ganz Cooney
- Midge Decter
- Joseph Epstein (writer)
- Elizabeth Fox-Genovese
- Jean Fritz
- Hal Holbrook
- Edith Kurzweil
- Frank M. Snowden, Jr.
- John Updike

2004

- Marva Collins
- Gertrude Himmelfarb
- Hilton Kramer
- Madeleine L'Engle
- Harvey Mansfield
- John Searle
- Shelby Steele
- United States Capitol Historical Society

2005

- Walter Berns
- Matthew Bogdanos
- Eva Brann
- John Lewis Gaddis
- Richard Gilder
- Mary Ann Glendon
- Leigh Keno
- Leslie Keno
- Alan Charles Kors
- Lewis Lehrman
- Judith Martin
- The Papers of George Washington, University of Virginia

2006

- Fouad Ajami
- James M. Buchanan
- Nickolas Davatzes
- Robert Fagles
- Mary Lefkowitz
- Bernard Lewis
- Mark Noll
- Meryle Secrest
- Kevin Starr
- Hoover Institution on War, Revolution, and Peace, Stanford University

2007

- Stephen H. Balch
- Russell Freedman
- Victor Davis Hanson
- Roger Hertog
- Cynthia Ozick
- Richard Pipes
- Pauline L. Schultz
- Henry Leonard Snyder
- Ruth Wisse
- Monuments Men Foundation for the Preservation of Art

2008

- Gabor Boritt
- Richard Brookhiser
- Harold Holzer
- Myron Magnet
- Albert Marrin
- Milton J. Rosenberg
- Jordan Horner Saunders
- Thomas A. Saunders III
- Robert H. Smith
- John Templeton Foundation
- Norman Rockwell Museum

2009

- Robert Caro
- Annette Gordon-Reed
- David Levering Lewis
- William Hardy McNeill
- Philippe de Montebello
- Albert H. Small
- Ted Sorensen
- Elie Wiesel

2010

- Daniel Aaron
- Bernard Bailyn
- Jacques Barzun
- Wendell E. Berry
- Roberto González Echevarría
- Stanley Nider Katz
- Joyce Carol Oates
- Arnold Rampersad
- Philip Roth
- Gordon S. Wood

2011

- Kwame Anthony Appiah
- John Ashbery
- Robert Darnton
- Andrew Delbanco
- Charles Rosen
- Teofilo Ruiz
- Ramón Saldívar
- Amartya Sen
- National History Day

2012

- Edward L. Ayers
- William G. Bowen
- Jill Ker Conway
- Natalie Zemon Davis
- Frank Deford
- Joan Didion
- Robert D. Putnam
- Kay Ryan
- Marilynne Robinson
- Robert B. Silvers
- Anna Deavere Smith
- Camilo José Vergara

2013

- M. H. Abrams
- American Antiquarian Society
- David Brion Davis
- William Theodore de Bary
- Darlene Clark Hine
- Johnpaul Jones
- Stanley Nelson Jr.
- Diane Rehm
- Anne Firor Scott
- Krista Tippett

2014

- The Clemente Course in the Humanities
- Annie Dillard
- Everett L. Fly
- Evelyn Brooks Higginbotham
- Jhumpa Lahiri
- Fedwa Malti-Douglas
- Larry McMurtry
- Rebecca Newberger Goldstein
- Vicki L. Ruiz
- Alice Waters

2015

- Rudolfo Anaya
- José Andrés
- Ron Chernow
- Louise Glück
- Terry Gross
- Louis Menand
- Elaine Pagels
- Prison University Project
- Wynton Marsalis
- James McBride
- Abraham Verghese
- Isabel Wilkerson

2016

- None awarded

2017

- None awarded

2018

- None awarded

2019

- The Claremont Institute
- Teresa Lozano Long
- Patrick O'Connell
- James Patterson

2020

- Kay Coles James
- O. James Lighthizer
- The National World War II Museum

2021

- Richard Blanco
- Johnnetta Betsch Cole
- Walter Isaacson
- Earl Lewis
- Henrietta Mann
- Ann Patchett
- Bryan Stevenson
- Amy Tan
- Tara Westover
- Colson Whitehead
- Native America Calling

2022

- Wallis Annenberg
- Appalshop
- Joy Harjo
- Robin Harris
- Juan Felipe Herrera
- Robert Martin
- Jon Meacham
- Ruth Simmons
- Pauline Yu
- Elton John

2023

- LeVar Burton
- Roz Chast
- Nicolás Kanellos
- Robin Wall Kimmerer
- Mellon Foundation
- Dawn Porter
- Aaron Sorkin
- Darren Walker
- Rosita Worl
- Anthony Bourdain

== See also ==
- National Medal of Arts
- National Medal of Science
- National Medal of Technology and Innovation
