= CUNY Latin/Greek Institute =

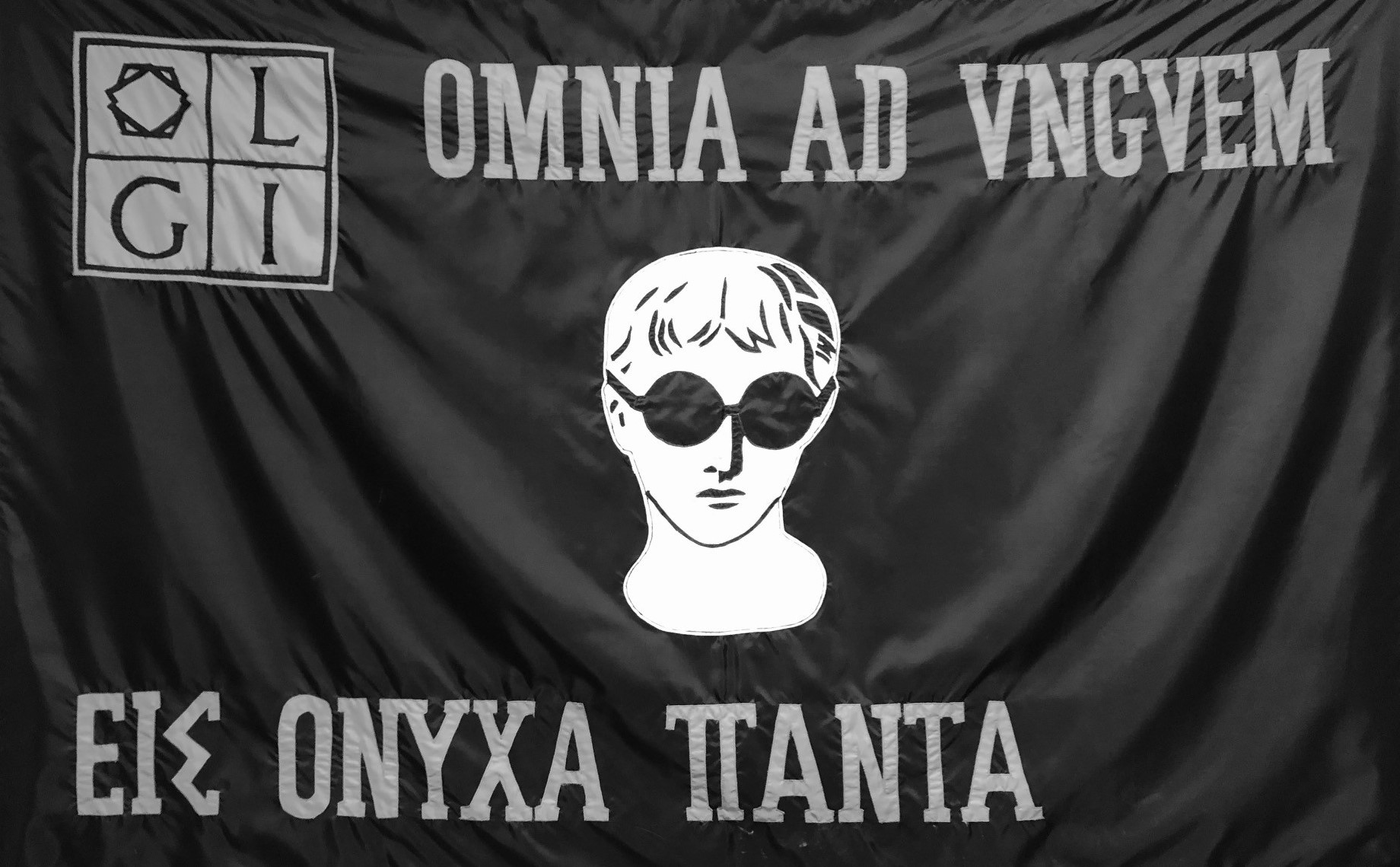
Flag of the CUNY Latin/Greek Institute

The CUNY Latin/Greek Institute was established by Brooklyn College, a senior college of the City University of New York, in 1973. It was initially called the Latin Institute, until the introduction of Ancient Greek precipitated a name change to the Latin / Greek Institute. The Institute is commonly referenced by its initials, LGI.

The basic programs of the LGI teach the equivalent of 5-6 semesters of college Latin or Greek in 50 days of highly intensive and choreographed study. Both basic programs are taught in-person every summer at the CUNY Graduate Center, along with one upper-level program in either Latin or Greek. Since the COVID pandemic, the upper-level programs have been taught online. Graduates of the LGI return to their home institutions able to engage advanced reading courses in Latin or Greek and/or sit for graduate language exams.

As of 2024, the LGI has graduated almost 3,000 students across all of its programs.

== History ==
The LGI was established in the context of a general decline in the teaching of Latin (and, to a lesser extent, Greek) in the decades following the Second World War. At the same time, competency in the languages remained important to a range of disciplines (such as history, philosophy, comparative literature, art history, and archaeology). For many aspiring scholars in these fields, early exposure to Latin and/or Greek had become increasingly uncommon and, by the graduate level of study, were faced with few options for and insufficient time to gain rapid facility with them.

The origins and direct progenitor of the LGI took shape at the University of California at Berkeley. There, in the mid 1960s, Floyd L. Moreland, at the time a graduate student in Classics, developed an accelerated program in Latin designed to help PhD students in the humanities pass their required Latin translation exam.

Moreland devised a basic curriculum and assembled a patchwork of study materials drawn from a variety of sources: textbooks were carved up and reorganized, and a range of handouts – which remain a staple at the Institute – were developed; many of these were prototypes of the materials that continue in use at the LGI. Finally, he identified, recruited, and trained fellow graduate students on his nascent methodologies.

Offered in the summer of 1967, the accelerated class achieved its objectives and provided proof of concept for Moreland’s model for rapid language acquisition. What started as a small, limited offering was subsequently broadened and formalized into the Berkeley Summer Latin Workshop shortly thereafter. The program (now called the Berkley Greek & Latin Summer Workshops) continues to the present day.

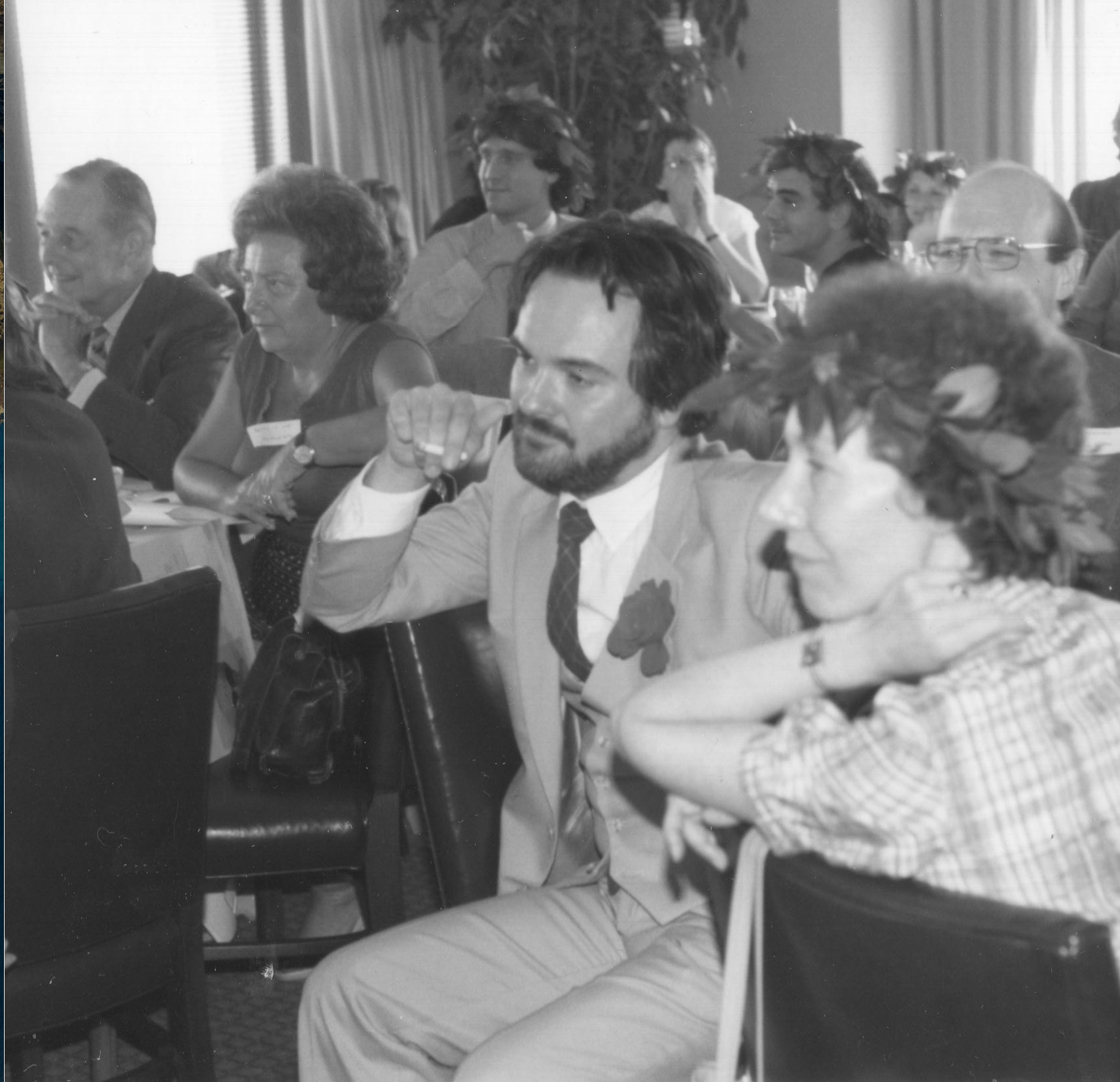
(L-R): Ethyle Wolfe, Floyd Moreland, and Rita Fleischer at the 1981 LGI Graduation

In 1971, Classics department chair Ethyle Wolfe recruited the now Dr. Moreland to the faculty of Brooklyn College with the specific intention of establishing a similar intensive program. One of Moreland’s first recruits to the instructional staff was Rita Fleischer, with whom he would eventually author Latin: An Intensive Course, which was specifically designed (and remains in use) for the Basic Latin Program. The first Latin Institute was held in the summer of 1973, with 40 students enrolled.

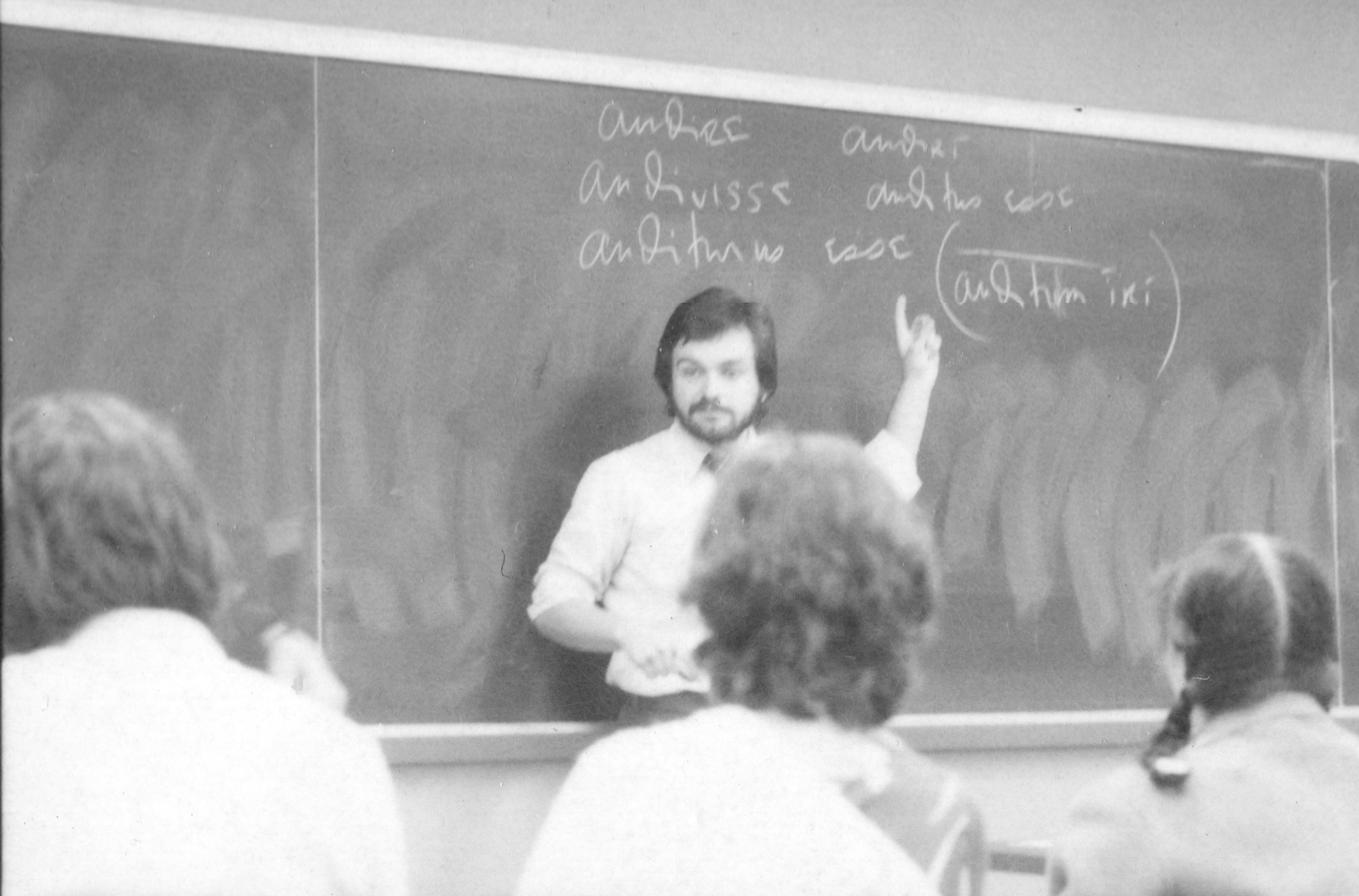
Floyd Moreland lecturing on the Latin infinitive and formation of indirect statement. Day 7 of the inaugural Latin Institute, June 19, 1973

Among Wolfe’s other recruits was Hardy Hansen who, along with Fordham University’s Gerald Quinn, developed and launched a parallel program in Ancient Greek in 1978 (and the Latin Institute consequently retitled the CUNY Latin/Greek Institute). The textbook developed for the Basic Greek Program, Greek: An Intensive Course, has been a longstanding bestseller at the Fordham University Press.

Later program additions include Advanced Latin (launched in 1980) and Advanced Greek (1981), which were offered via the CUNY Graduate Center’s Department of Classics until 1988. Upper-level Latin and Greek programs were reintroduced in the mid-1990s. Since 2020, the upper-level programs have been delivered online, a holdover of the COVID pandemic.

Moreland stepped down from the directorship in 1992, succeeded in the role by Hansen. Although he continued to teach Greek at the Institute, Hansen retired as director in 2013 and was followed by Dr. Katherine Lu Hsu. In 2014, Hsu secured a $1,000,000 scholarship endowment from the Stavros Niarchos Foundation. In 2020, Hsu moved to the College of Holy Cross and Dr. Lucas G. Rubin was appointed LGI director.

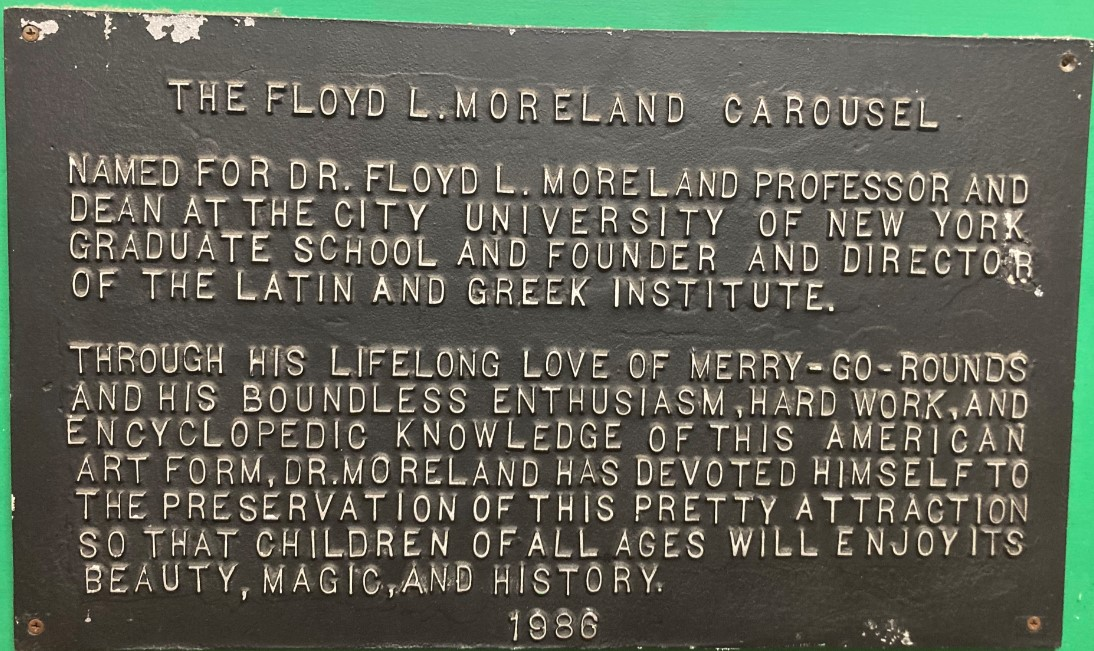
Dedication plaque of the Floyd L. Moreland Carousel in Seaside Heights, New Jersey.

Following his retirement, Moreland played a pivotal role in the restoration of the famous Dentzel/Looff carousel at Seaside Heights, New Jersey, which was renamed the Dr. Floyd L. Moreland Carousel in his honor; its dedicatory plaque mentions his role in founding the Institute. He died on May 17, 2025.

In 2023, the LGI was prominently featured in the Magisterial Feminae: How Women Who Studied the Ancient World Innovated Brooklyn College, the Latin Greek Institute, and Beyond exhibition at Brooklyn College. On display were an array of materials connected to the Institute's faculty, curriculum, and traditions. In April 2025, Rubin published a photographic history of the Institute, The Latin/Greek Institute at the City University of New York.

== Pedagogy ==
The LGI method is shaped around two overarching concepts: (1) the generation and sustainment of learning momentum; and (2) the introduction of grammar and morphology not by complexity but by their necessity for reading original texts as early as possible. Maintenance of learning momentum is facilitated in a number of ways; faculty, for instance, are on-call outside of classes and afterhours to eliminate immediate barriers to learning. The Institute’s methodology is more of an integrated process than a set of classes.

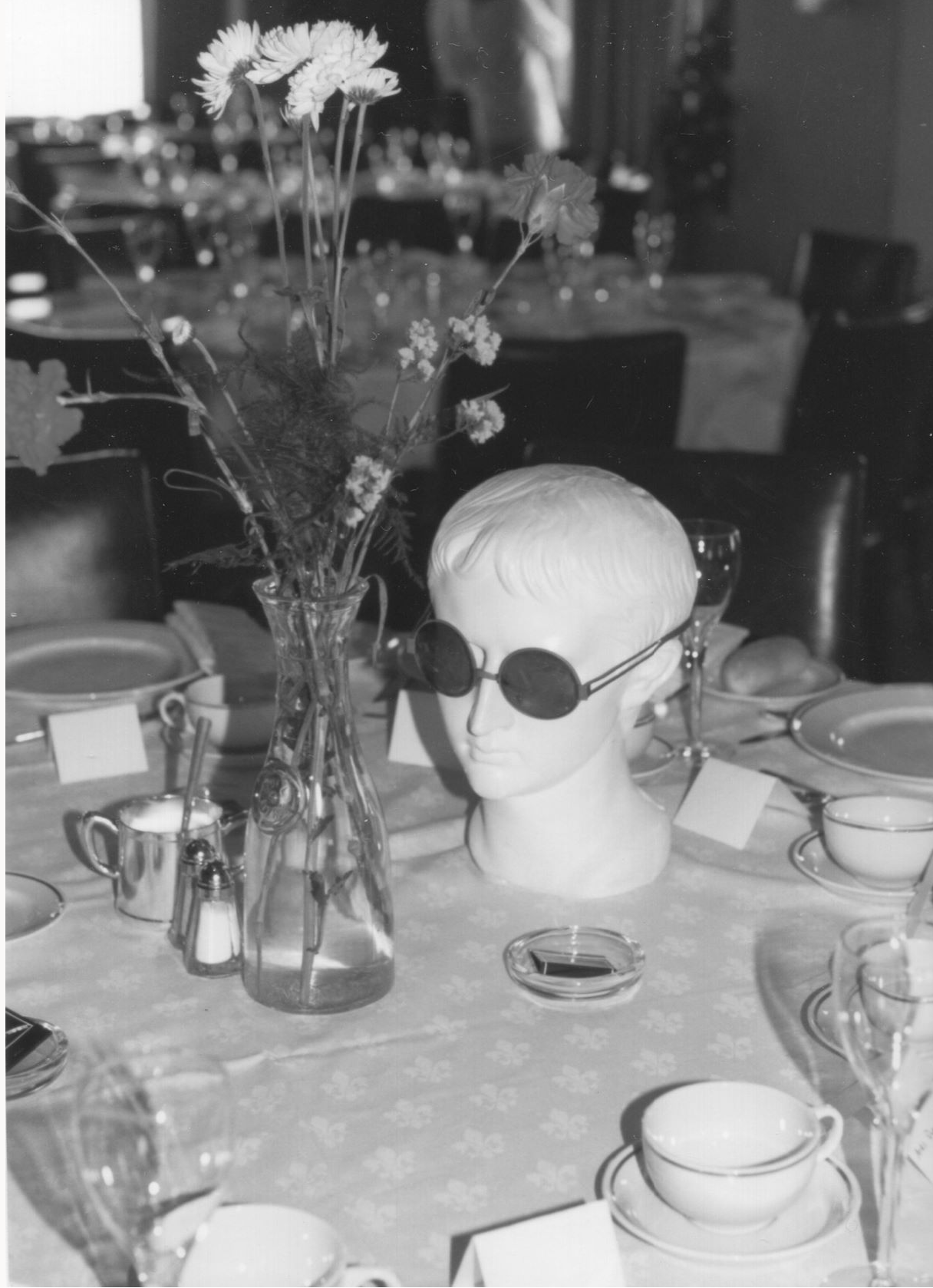
The LGI mascot, a bust of Augustus wearing sunglasses, appears in many of its communications and is often present at events (as here at the 1981 graduation).

The first half of both basic programs is dedicated to the mastery of essential morphology, grammar, and syntax (five weeks in Latin; six in Greek). Each afternoon consists of a comprehensive lecture of new material, followed by a vocabulary presentation (at the conclusion of the programs, students command a core vocabulary of essential, high frequency words – as well as the tools for decoding compounds and unfamiliar vocabulary). The following morning, small-section drills confirm students’ facility with the material presented the previous afternoon (as opposed to re-teaching). In the programs’ second half, students read a large number of original, un-adapted texts in both prose and poetry. Latin students read 15 poems by Catullus, Cicero’s First Oration Against Catiline, extensive selections of Sallust’s Bellum Catilinae, the fourth book of Vergil's Aeneid, and 20 poems from Horace's Odes. In Greek, students tackle Plato’s Ion and Euripides’ Medea. In the afternoons, both programs complete a representative survey of literature (prose and poetry) and are introduced to essential skills and relevant topics (textual criticism, meter, historical linguistics, epigraphy, etc.). The last two weeks also include electives which allow for a deeper exploration of one author or genre. In both programs, there is extensive emphasis on prose composition and sight-reading. The upper programs focus on reading a significant amount of text in a short period (around 150 lines a night).

Most of the faculty are themselves graduates of the Institute.

== Traditions ==
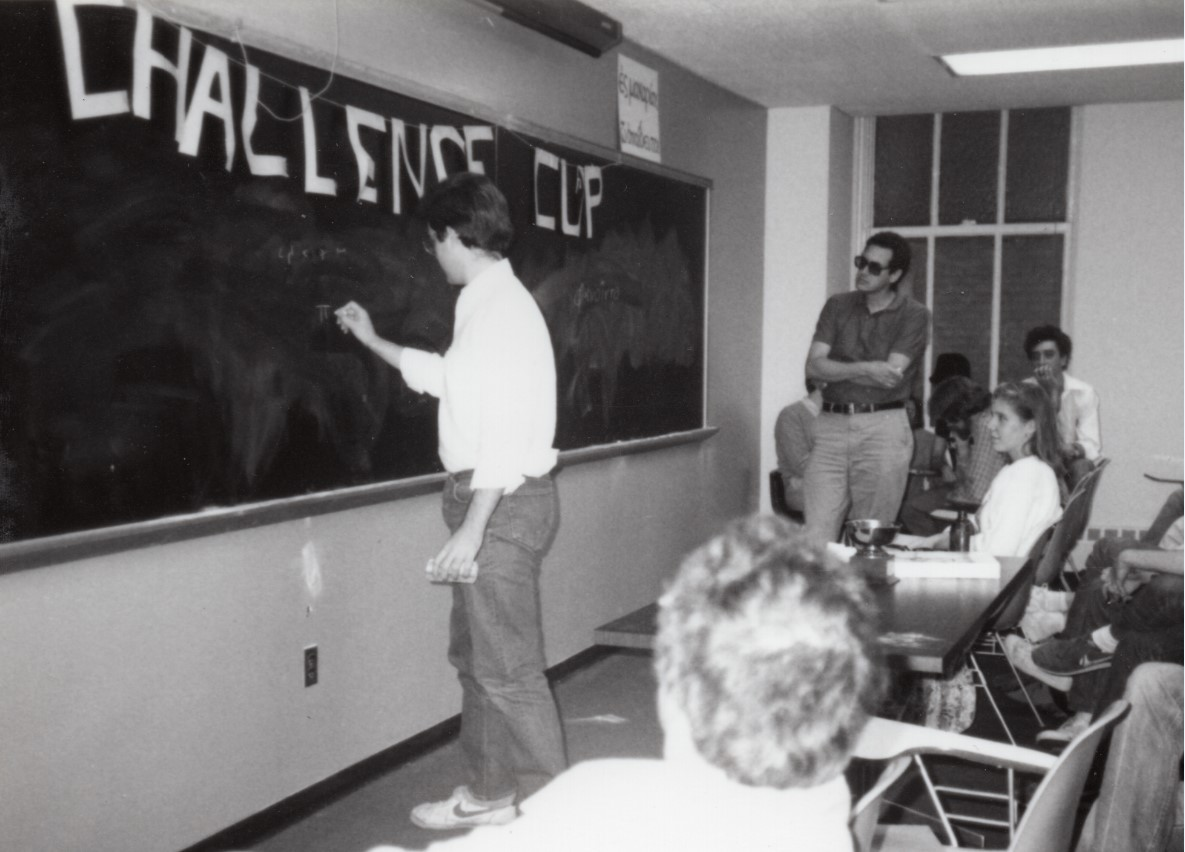
Seth Benardete, LGI faculty member, watches his student opponent generate a Greek verb in the 1986 Hoplite Challenge Cup.

Over the years, a number of distinct traditions have become part of the in-person student experience. At the conclusion of their Greek grammar studies (Day 29, Friday of the sixth week), Basic Greek students compete against faculty in the Hoplite Challenge Cup, a contest of Greek verb morphology. By this time, students are able to generate more than 16,000 possible forms of 114 of the most common (and/or representative) verbs. Program alumni are allowed to compete on the faculty team.

In 2016, faculty member Jeremy March developed an app version of the Hoplite Challenge Cup.

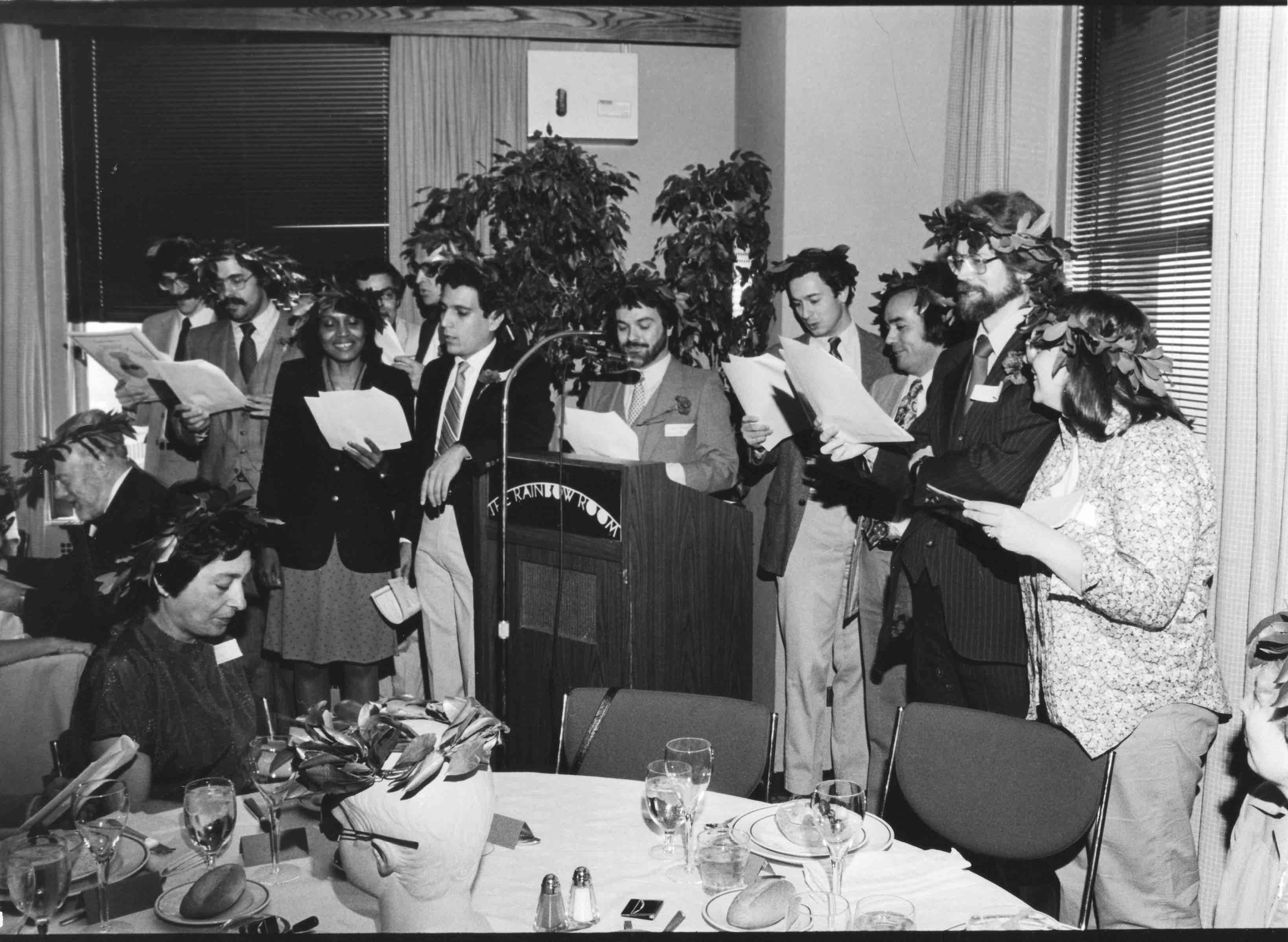
Faculty lead the singing of "Gaudeamus Igitur" at the 1982 LGI Graduation, held at the Rainbow Room

Although it confers no certificate, the LGI holds a graduation, which is held the Friday before the programs’ final exam. The first was a simple social affair held at the since-demolished Piccadilly Hotel (located at 227 West 45th Street) and culminated in a student parody of Aeneid IV and a singing of “Light My Pyre” (led by a student dressed as the god Mercury). The ceremony subsequently became more elaborate, incorporating a number of unique customs and traditions. In the 1980s and 1990s, it was held at several famed establishments, including Windows on the World, the Rainbow Room, and Fraunces Tavern. The event is marked by a specially generated trilingual program (in Latin, Greek, and English), with students’ names and the afternoon's menu rendered in Latin and Greek. Students are also wreathed on their arrival, and a number of humorous poems (penned by faculty over the years) are read. Attendees also sing Gaudeamus Igitur, with additional stanzas extolling the Institute (one in Latin, the other in Greek).

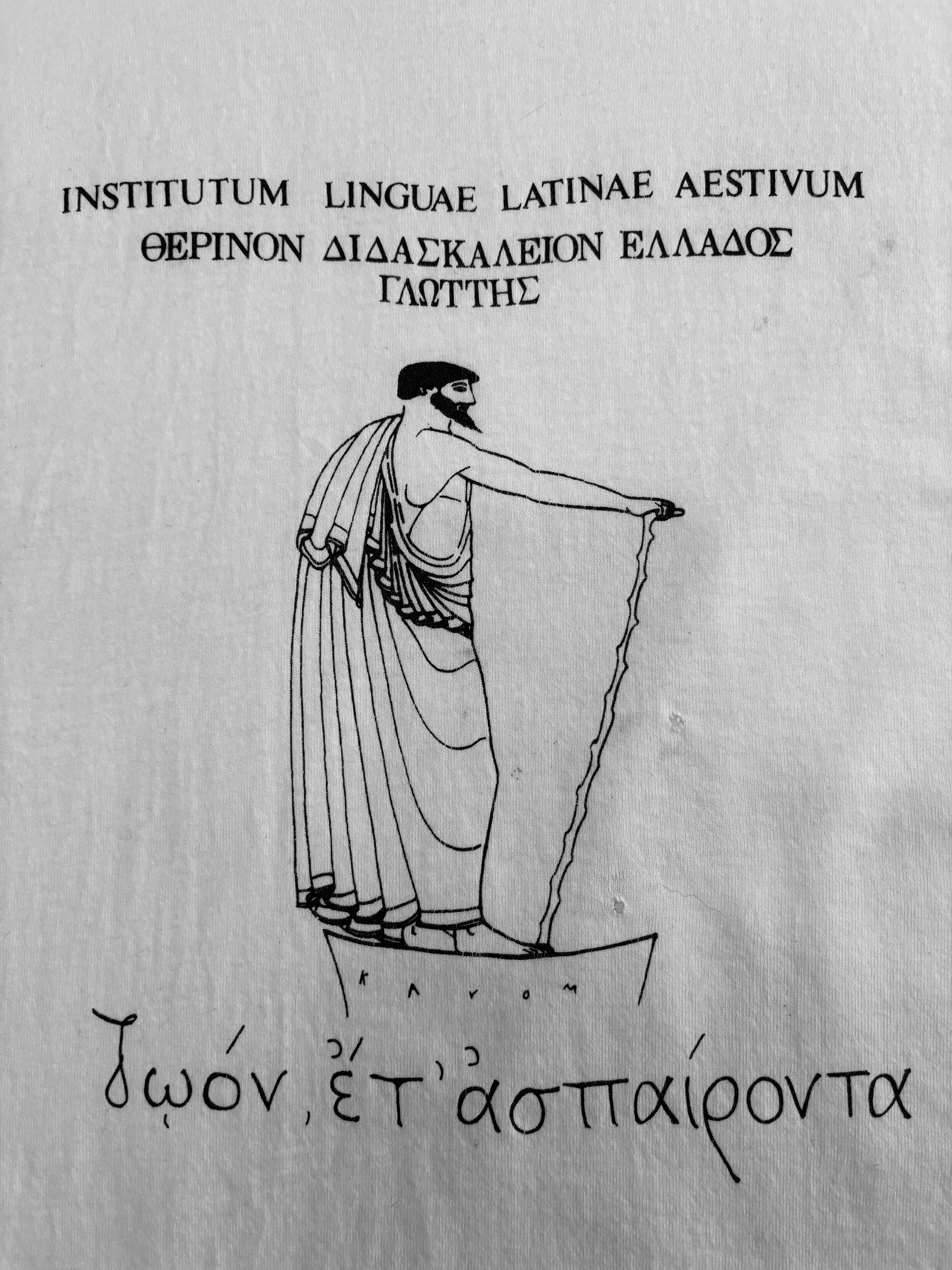
T-shirt from the LGI's 1996 Basic Greek Program. the quote is from Plato’s Ion (539c): ζῳόν, ἔτ ̓ ἀσπαίροντα (“alive, still gasping”), which is read during the summer.

Since the mid-1980s, students in each program have also memorialized their experience by designing commemorative t-shirts. These often include a quote from a work read that summer, with themes of struggle, suffering, and/or perseverance predominant.

== Motto ==
The LGI motto, omnia ad unguem (“everything to the fingernail”), conveys the precision of the curriculum by invoking the craft of the ancient sculptor, who would ensure the quality and finish of their work by running a fingernail over its surface. The practice is referenced by Horace (Ars Poetica 294), while the Greek (εἰς ὄνυχα πάντα) has been ascribed to a lost treatise of the sculptor Polykleitos of Argos.
