= Presbyterian Healthcare Services =

Health care system in New Mexico, US

Presbyterian
- Founded: 1908
- Headquarters: Albuquerque, New Mexico, United States
- Area served: New Mexico
- Services: Healthcare
- Number of employees: 1,000+ physicians and practitioners, 700+ volunteers and 2,600+ employed nurses for a total of 12,000+ employees (statewide)
- Website: www.phs.org

Presbyterian Healthcare Services is a private not-for-profit health care system and health care provider in the State of New Mexico. It owns and operates 9 hospitals in 7 New Mexico communities as well as Presbyterian Homes & Services, an organization providing retirement and senior care. It also operates Presbyterian Health Plan.

== History ==
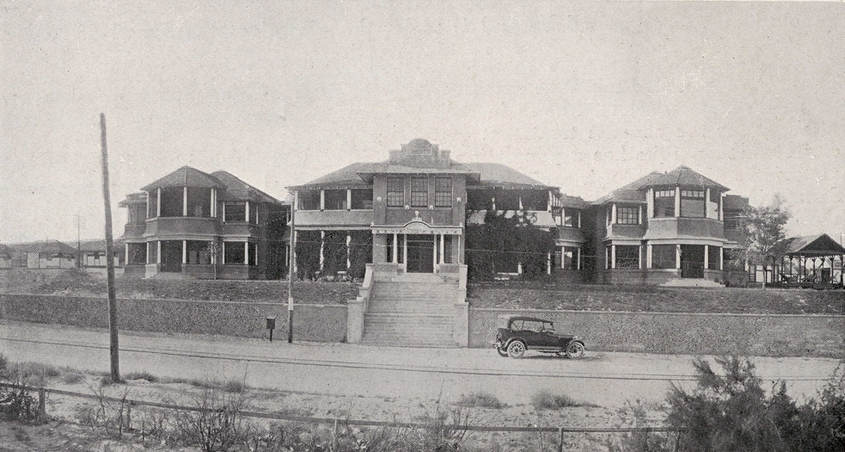
The Sanitarium in 1911

In 1908, Rev. Hugh A. Cooper, a Presbyterian pastor in Albuquerque founded the Southwest Presbyterian Sanatorium, a facility for the hundreds of tuberculosis patients coming to Albuquerque. By 1950, with tuberculosis under control, its future became in doubt. The board of directors hired a professional hospital administrator to help manage the institution. A new administrator brought a new focus, and a new name: The Presbyterian Hospital Center. Presbyterian Healthcare Services also named its administration center as the Rev. Hugh A Cooper Administration Center after its founder. This building located near the Albuquerque International Balloon Fiesta Park, houses the executives of the organization as well as 2,500+ permanent and contracted employees with a daily visitation of up to 3,500+ employees, patients, contractors and customers at its administration center.

Presbyterian Healthcare Services has grown since its founding in 1908 to include a system of 9 hospitals, a multi-specialty medical group with more than 900 providers, and a statewide health plan. The broad system serves approximately one third of all New Mexicans with either healthcare services or the healthcare insurance plan. In 2022, the New Mexico Hospital Association selected four of the PHS healthcare facilities for awards: Lincoln County Medical Center, Socorro General Hospital, Presbyterian Kaseman, and Presbyterian Rust.

The Presbyterian Hospital Center grew through the 1960s and 1970s: Kaseman Hospital, a satellite facility in northeastern Albuquerque opened, the state's first HMO health plan was established, a statewide multi-hospital system was formed. The Presbyterian Hospital Center was renamed Southwestern Community Health Services, and finally the present Presbyterian Hospital

=== Hospitals ===
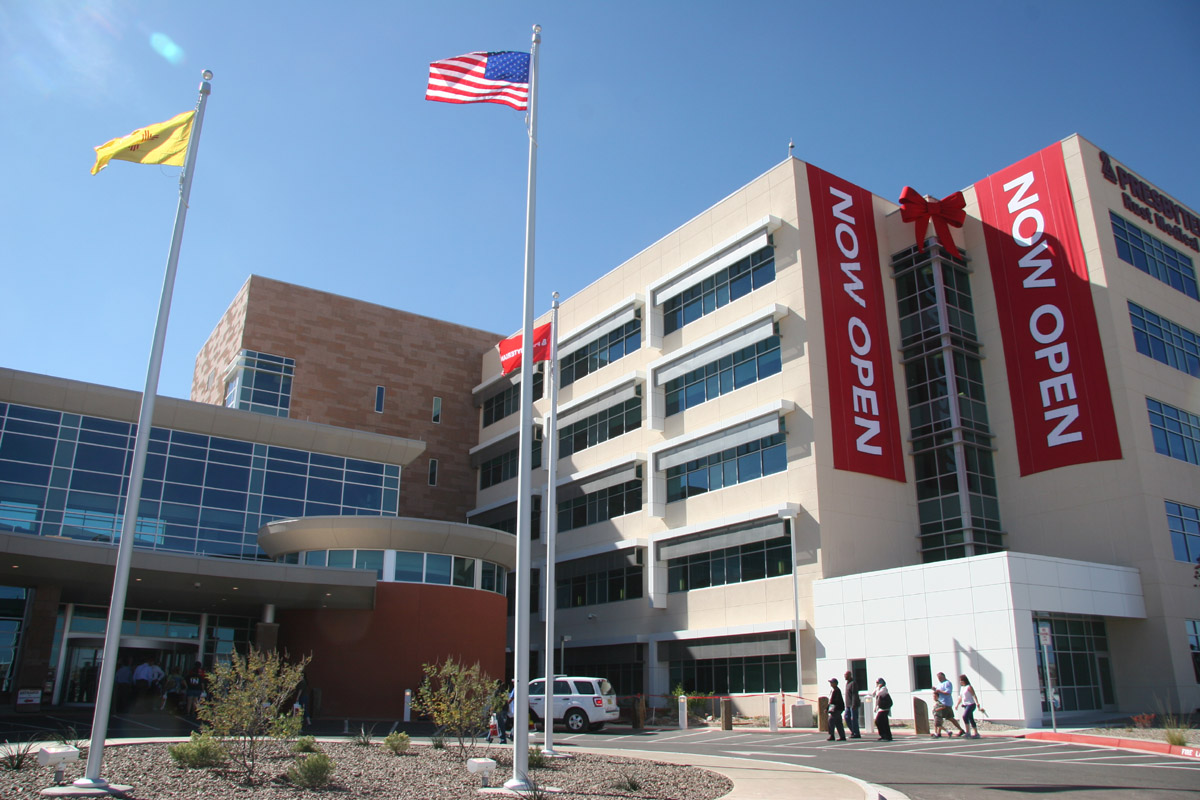
Rust Medical Center opened in 2011

- Presbyterian Downtown Hospital Albuquerque (453 beds)
- Presbyterian–Kaseman Hospital Albuquerque
- Plains Regional Medical Center Clovis (106 beds)
- Presbyterian–Espanola Hospital Espanola (80 beds)
- Presbyterian–Rust Medical Center Rio Rancho (162 beds)
- Lincoln County Medical Center Ruidoso (39 beds)
- Socorro General Hospital Socorro (25 beds)
- Dan C. Trigg Memorial Hospital Tucumcari (25 beds)
- Presbyterian Santa Fe Medical Center Santa Fe (30 beds)
