= Criticism of Facebook =

Facebook (and parent company Meta Platforms) has been the subject of criticism and legal action since it was founded in 2004. Criticisms include the outsize influence Facebook has on the lives and health of its users and employees, as well as Facebook's influence on the way media, specifically news, is reported and distributed. Notable issues include Internet privacy, such as use of a widespread "like" button on third-party websites tracking users, possible indefinite records of user information, automatic facial recognition software, and its role in the workplace, including employer-employee account disclosure. The use of Facebook can have negative psychological and physiological effects that include feelings of sexual jealousy, stress, lack of attention, and social media addiction that in some cases is comparable to drug addiction.

Facebook's operations have also received coverage. The company's electricity usage, tax avoidance, real-name user requirement policies, censorship policies, handling of user data, and its involvement in the United States PRISM surveillance program and Facebook–Cambridge Analytica data scandal have been highlighted by the media and by critics. Facebook has come under scrutiny for 'ignoring' or shirking its responsibility for the content posted on its platform, including copyright and intellectual property infringement, hate speech, incitement of rape, violence against minorities, terrorism, fake news, Facebook murder, crimes, and violent incidents live-streamed through its Facebook Live functionality.

The company and its employees have also been subject to litigation cases over the years, with its most prominent case concerning allegations that CEO Mark Zuckerberg broke an oral contract with Cameron Winklevoss, Tyler Winklevoss, and Divya Narendra to build the then-named "HarvardConnection" social network in 2004, instead allegedly opting to steal the idea and code to launch Facebook months before HarvardConnection began. The original lawsuit was eventually settled in 2009, with Facebook paying approximately $20 million in cash and 1.25 million shares. A new lawsuit in 2011 was dismissed. This, alongside another controversy involving Zuckerberg and fellow co-founder and former CFO Eduardo Saverin, was further explored in the 2010 American biographical drama film The Social Network. Some critics point to problems which they say will result in the demise of Facebook. Facebook has been banned by several governments for various reasons, including Syria, China, Iran and Russia.

== Censorship ==
While Facebook operates transparent policies around certain types of content moderation—such as the removing of hateful speech and images which contain sex or violence—the company has been criticized for selectively censoring information in nontransparent ways. Some examples of this include:

=== Censorship of criticism of Facebook ===
Newspapers regularly report stories of users who claim they've been censored on Facebook for being critical of Facebook itself, with their posts removed or made less visible. Examples include Elizabeth Warren in 2019 and Rotem Shtarkman in 2016.

In the context of media reports and lawsuits from people formerly working on Facebook content moderation, a former Facebook moderator (Chris Gray) has claimed that specific rules existed to monitor and sometimes target posts about Facebook which are anti-Facebook or criticize Facebook for some action, for instance by matching the keywords "Facebook" or "DeleteFacebook".

Facebook's search function has been accused of preventing users from searching for certain terms. Michael Arrington of TechCrunch has written about Facebook's possible censorship of "Ron Paul" as a search term. MoveOn.org's Facebook group for organizing protests against privacy violations could for a time not be found through searching, the word privacy was also restricted.

=== Censorship around global politics ===
In 2015, it was reported that Facebook has a policy to censor anything related to Kurdish opposition against Turkey, such as maps of Kurdistan, flags of Kurdish armed terrorist groups (such as PKK and YPG), and criticism of Mustafa Kemal Atatürk, the founder of Turkey.

In 2016, Facebook banned and also removed content regarding the Kashmir conflict.

During a podcast, Mark Zuckerberg admitted that Facebook suppressed all the coverage of Joe Biden's son's email leaks during the 2020 United States elections due to a general request from the FBI. The censored news claimed that the son of Joe Biden, who was vice-president in Obama's administration, used his father's influence to fix a deal with a Ukrainian businessman.

In 2025, following outreach from the United States Department of Justice, Facebook removed a Facebook group that was used to share information about Immigration and Customs Enforcement.

==== Censorship in line with US foreign policy ====
In 2021, Facebook was accused of censoring messages critical of Israel and supportive of Palestine. During conflict over the Sheikh Jarrah property dispute in 2021, Facebook was accused of deleting hundreds of posts critical of Israel. Senior Facebook officials apologized to the Palestinian Prime Minister for censoring pro-Palestinian voices.

In October 2021, a secret blacklist of "dangerous individuals and organizations" maintained by Facebook was discovered by The Intercept, which revealed censorship in the MENA region was stricter than in USA. Critics and scholars have argued the blacklist and the guideline stifles free discussion, as well as enforcing an uneven enforcement of the rules.

=== Abortion ===
Facebook has reduced abortion content in 2024.

== Privacy issues ==
Facebook has faced a number of privacy concerns; for instance, in August 2019, it was revealed that the company had enlisted contractors to generate transcripts of users' audio chats. The contractors were tasked with re-transcribing the conversations in order to gauge the accuracy of the automatic transcription tool. In part these concerns stem from the company's revenue model that involves selling information about its users, and the loss of privacy this could entail. In addition, employers and other organizations and individuals have been known to use Facebook data for their own purposes. As a result peoples' identities have sometimes been revealed without their permission. In response, pressure groups and governments have increasingly asserted the users' right to privacy and to control their personal data.

=== Handling subpoenas seeking activists ===
==== Protestors and activists against mass deportation ====
In 2026, several subpoenas orders were sent by the DHS to several social media companies, including Meta (for Facebook and Instagram). The purpose was to uncover data of several activists who operated accounts expressing dissent against mass deportation. Though companies have the option to decline and be contest the subpoenas if they believe it is unreasonable, Meta complied with the order and notified the users being sought out of this. Several of these subpoenas have already been withdrawn upon legal challenge, including one sent to Meta.

==== Pro-Palestinian activists ====
During the 2025 pro-Palestinian student advocacy, student activists were also targeted for subpoenas by Homeland Security Investigations, in which Meta notified the users of.

== Psychological/sociological effects ==
In addition to noting with evolutionary biologist George C. Williams in the development of evolutionary medicine that most chronic medical conditions are the consequence of evolutionary mismatches between a stateless environment of nomadic hunter-gatherer life in bands and contemporary human life in sedentary technologically modern state societies (e.g. WEIRD societies), psychiatrist Randolph M. Nesse has argued that evolutionary mismatch is an important factor in the development of certain mental disorders. In 1948, 50 percent of U.S. households owned at least one automobile. In 2000, a majority of U.S. households had at least one personal computer and internet access the following year. In 2002, a majority of U.S. survey respondents reported having a mobile phone. In September 2007, a majority of U.S. survey respondents reported having broadband internet at home. In January 2013, a majority of U.S. survey respondents reported owning a smartphone.

=== Facebook addiction ===
The "World Unplugged" study, which was conducted in 2011, claims that for some users quitting social networking sites is comparable to quitting smoking or giving up alcohol. Another study conducted in 2012 by researchers from the University of Chicago Booth School of Business in the United States found that drugs like alcohol and tobacco could not keep up with social networking sites regarding their level of addictiveness. A 2013 study in the journal CyberPsychology, Behavior, and Social Networking found that some users decided to quit social networking sites because they felt they were addicted. In 2014, the site went down for about 30 minutes, prompting several users to call emergency services.

In April 2015, the Pew Research Center published a survey of 1,060 U.S. teenagers ages 13 to 17 who reported that nearly three-quarters of them either owned or had access to a smartphone, 92 percent went online daily with 24 percent saying they went online "almost constantly". In March 2016, Frontiers in Psychology published a survey of 457 post-secondary student Facebook users (following a face validity pilot of another 47 post-secondary student Facebook users) at a large university in North America showing that the severity of ADHD symptoms had a statistically significant positive correlation with Facebook usage while driving a motor vehicle and that impulses to use Facebook while driving were more potent among male users than female users.

In June 2018, Children and Youth Services Review published a regression analysis of 283 adolescent Facebook users in the Piedmont and Lombardy regions of Northern Italy (that replicated previous findings among adult users) showing that adolescents reporting higher ADHD symptoms positively predicted Facebook addiction, persistent negative attitudes about the past and that the future is predetermined and not influenced by present actions, and orientation against achieving future goals, with ADHD symptoms additionally increasing the manifestation of the proposed category of psychological dependence known as "problematic social media use".

In October 2023, court documents in the US alleged Meta of designing its platforms deliberately to develop addiction in children using them. The company knowingly allowed underage users to hold accounts, violating the Children's Online Privacy Protection Act. According to whistleblower Frances Haugen, the company intentionally targets children below the age of 18.

=== Self-harm and suicide ===
Research shows that people who are feeling suicidal use the internet to search for suicide methods. Websites provide graphic details and information on how to take your own life. This cannot be right. Where this content breaches the policies of internet and social media providers it must be removed.

— Matt Hancock, Health Secretary of the United Kingdom

I do not think it is going too far to question whether even you, the owners, any longer have any control over [the sites'] content. If that is the case, then children should not be accessing your services at all, and parents should be aware that the idea of any authority overseeing algorithms and content is a mirage.

— Anne Longfield, Children's Commissioner for England

In January 2019, both the Health Secretary of the United Kingdom, and the Children's Commissioner for England, urged Facebook and other social media companies to take responsibility for the risk to children posed by content on their platforms related to self-harm and suicide.

=== Envy ===
Facebook has been criticized for making people envious and unhappy due to the constant exposure to positive yet unrepresentative highlights of their peers. Such highlights include, but are not limited to, journal posts, videos, and photos that depict or reference such positive or otherwise outstanding activities, experiences, and facts. This effect is caused mainly by the fact that most users of Facebook usually only display the positive aspects of their lives while excluding the negative, though it is also strongly connected to inequality and the disparities between social groups as Facebook is open to users from all classes of society. Sites such as AddictionInfo.org state that this kind of envy has profound effects on other aspects of life and can lead to severe depression, self-loathing, rage and hatred, resentment, feelings of inferiority and insecurity, pessimism, suicidal tendencies and desires, social isolation, and other issues that can prove very serious. This condition has often been called "Facebook Envy" or "Facebook Depression" by the media.

In 2010, Social Science Computer Review published research by economists Ralf Caers and Vanessa Castelyns who sent an online questionnaire to 398 and 353 LinkedIn and Facebook users respectively in Belgium and found that both sites had become tools for recruiting job applicants for professional occupations as well as additional information about applicants, and that it was being used by recruiters to decide which applicants would receive interviews. In 2017, sociologist Ofer Sharone conducted interviews with unemployed workers to research the effects of LinkedIn and Facebook as labor market intermediaries and found that social networking services (SNS) have had a filtration effect that has little to do with evaluations of merit, and that the SNS filtration effect has exerted new pressures on workers to manage their careers to conform to the logic of the SNS filtration effect.

A joint study conducted by two German universities demonstrated Facebook envy and found that as many as one out of three people actually feel worse and less satisfied with their lives after visiting the site. Vacation photos were found to be the most common source of feelings of resentment and jealousy. After that, social interaction was the second biggest cause of envy, as Facebook users compare the number of birthday greetings, likes, and comments to those of their friends. Visitors who contributed the least tended to feel the worst. "According to our findings, passive following triggers invidious emotions, with users mainly envying happiness of others, the way others spend their vacations; and socialize", the study states.

A 2013 study by researchers at the University of Michigan found that the more people used Facebook, the worse they felt afterwards.

Narcissistic users who show excessive grandiosity give negative emotion to viewers and cause envy, but as a result, that may cause viewers' loneliness. Viewers sometimes need to terminate relationships with them to avoid this negative emotion. However, this "avoidance" such as "terminate relationships" would be reinforcement and it may lead to loneliness. The cyclical pattern is a vicious circle of loneliness and avoidance coping, the study states.

=== Divorce ===
Social networks, like Facebook, can have a detrimental effect on marriages, with users becoming worried about their spouse's contacts and relations with other people online, leading to marital breakdown and divorce. According to a 2009 survey in the UK, around 20 percent of divorce petitions included references to Facebook. Researchers proposed that high levels of Facebook use could result in Facebook-related conflict and breakup/divorce. Previous studies have shown that romantic relationships can be damaged by excessive Internet use, Facebook jealousy, partner surveillance, ambiguous information, and online portrayal of intimate relationships. Excessive Internet users reported having greater conflict in their relationships. Their partners feel neglected and there's lower commitment and lower feelings of passion and intimacy in the relationship. According to the article, researchers suspect that Facebook may contribute to an increase in divorce and infidelity rates in the near future due to the amount and ease of accessibility to connect with past partners. The use of Facebook can cause feelings of sexual jealousy.

=== Stress ===
Research performed by psychologists from Edinburgh Napier University indicated that Facebook adds stress to users' lives. Causes of stress included fear of missing important social information, fear of offending contacts, discomfort or guilt from rejecting user requests or deleting unwanted contacts or being unfriended or blocked by Facebook friends or other users, the displeasure of having friend requests rejected or ignored, the pressure to be entertaining, criticism or intimidation from other Facebook users, and having to use appropriate etiquette for different types of friends. Many people who started using Facebook for positive purposes or with positive expectations have found that the website has negatively impacted their lives.

Next to that, the increasing number of messages and social relationships embedded in SNS also increases the amount of social information demanding a reaction from SNS users. Consequently SNS users perceive they are giving too much social support to other SNS friends. This dark side of SNS usage is called 'social overload'. It is caused by the extent of usage, number of friends, subjective social support norms, and type of relationship (online-only vs offline friends) while age has only an indirect effect. The psychological and behavioral consequences of social overload include perceptions of SNS exhaustion, low user satisfaction, and high intentions to reduce or stop using SNS.

=== Narcissism ===
In July 2018, a meta-analysis published in Psychology of Popular Media found that grandiose narcissism positively correlated with time spent on social media, frequency of status updates, number of friends or followers, and frequency of posting self-portrait digital photographs, while a meta-analysis published in the Journal of Personality in April 2018 found that the positive correlation between grandiose narcissism and social networking service usage was replicated across platforms (including Facebook). In March 2020, the Journal of Adult Development published a regression discontinuity analysis of 254 Millennial Facebook users investigating differences in narcissism and Facebook usage between the age cohorts born from 1977 to 1990 and from 1991 to 2000 and found that the later born Millennials scored significantly higher on both. In June 2020, Addictive Behaviors published a systematic review finding a consistent, positive, and significant correlation between grandiose narcissism and the proposed category of psychological dependence called "problematic social media use". Also in 2018, social psychologist Jonathan Haidt and FIRE President Greg Lukianoff noted in The Coddling of the American Mind that former Facebook president Sean Parker stated in a 2017 interview that the Like button was consciously designed to prime users receiving likes to feel a dopamine rush as part of a "social-validation feedback loop".

=== Non-informing, knowledge-eroding medium ===
Facebook is a Big Tech company with over 2.7 billion monthly active users as of the second quarter of 2020 and therefore has a meaningful impact on the masses that use it. Big data algorithms are used in personalized content creation and automatization; however, this method can be used to manipulate users in various ways. The problem of misinformation is exacerbated by the educational bubble, users' critical thinking ability and news culture. Based on a 2015 study, 62.5% of the Facebook users are oblivious to any curation of their News Feed. Furthermore, scientists have started to investigate algorithms with unexpected outcomes that may lead to antisocial political, economic, geographic, racial, or other discrimination. Facebook has remained scarce in transparency of the inner workings of the algorithms used for News Feed correlation. Algorithms use the past activities as a reference point for predicting users' taste to keep them engaged. However, this leads to the formation of a filter bubble that starts to refrain users from diverse information. Users are left with a skewed worldview derived from their own preferences and biases.

In 2015, researchers from Facebook published a study indicating that the Facebook algorithm perpetuates an echo chamber amongst users by occasionally hiding content from individual feeds that users potentially would disagree with: for example the algorithm removed one in every 13 diverse content from news sources for self-identified liberals. In general, the results from the study indicated that the Facebook algorithm ranking system caused approximately 15% less diverse material in users' content feeds, and a 70% reduction in the click-through-rate of the diverse material. In 2018, social psychologist Jonathan Haidt and FIRE President Greg Lukianoff argued in The Coddling of the American Mind that the filter bubbles created by the News Feed algorithm of Facebook and other platforms are one of the principal factors amplifying political polarization in the United States since 2000 (when a majority of U.S. households first had at least one personal computer and then internet access the following year).

Facebook has, at least in the political field, a counter-effect on being informed: in two studies from the US with a total of more than 2,000 participants, the influence of social media on the general knowledge on political issues was examined in the context of two US presidential elections. The results showed that the frequency of Facebook use was moderately negatively related to general political knowledge. This was also the case when considering demographic, political-ideological variables and previous political knowledge. According to the latter, a causal relationship is indicated: the higher the Facebook use, the more the general political knowledge declines. In 2019, Jonathan Haidt argued that there is a "very good chance American democracy will fail, that in the next 30 years we will have a catastrophic failure of our democracy." Following the 2021 United States Capitol attack, in February 2021, Facebook announced that it would reduce the amount of political content in users News Feeds.

=== Other psychological effects ===
It has been admitted by many students that they have experienced bullying on the site, which leads to psychological harm. High school students face a possibility of bullying and other adverse behaviors over Facebook every day. Many studies have attempted to discover whether Facebook has a positive or negative effect on children's and teenagers' social lives, and many of them have come to the conclusion that there are distinct social problems that arise with Facebook usage. British neuroscientist Susan Greenfield stuck up for the issues that children encounter on social media sites, stating that these sites can rewire the brain, which caused some hysteria regarding the safety of social media usage. She did not back up her claims with research, but did cause quite a few studies to be done on the subject. When an individual's self-image is broken down by others as a result of badmouthing, criticism, harassment, criminalization or vilification, intimidation, demonization, demoralization, belittlement, or attacking someone over the site, it can cause much of the envy, anger, or depression users report feeling after prolonged Facebook usage.

Sherry Turkle, in her book Alone Together: Why We Expect More from Technology and Less from Each Other, argues that social media brings people closer and further apart at the same time. One of the main points she makes is that there is a high risk in treating persons online with dispatch like objects. Although people are networked on Facebook, their expectations of each other tend to be lessened. According to Turkle, this could cause a feeling of loneliness in spite of being together.

Between 2016 and 2018, the number of 12- to 15-year-olds who reported being bullied over social media rose from 6% to 11%, in the region covered by Ofcom.

=== User influence experiments ===
Academic and Facebook researchers have collaborated to test if the messages people see on Facebook can influence their behavior. For instance, in "A 61-Million-Person Experiment in Social Influence And Political Mobilization", during the 2010 elections, Facebook users were given the opportunity to "tell your friends you voted" by clicking on an "I voted" button. Users were 2% more likely to click the button if it was associated with friends who had already voted.

Much more controversially, a 2014 study of "Emotional Contagion Through Social Networks" manipulated the balance of positive and negative messages seen by 689,000 Facebook users. The researchers concluded that they had found "some of the first experimental evidence to support the controversial claims that emotions can spread throughout a network, [though] the effect sizes from the manipulations are small."

Unlike the "I voted" study, which had presumptively beneficial ends and raised few concerns, this study was criticized for both its ethics and methods/claims. As controversy about the study grew, Adam Kramer, a lead author of both studies and member of the Facebook data team, defended the work in a Facebook update. A few days later, Sheryl Sandburg, Facebook's COO, made a statement while traveling abroad. While at an Indian Chambers of Commerce event in New Delhi she stated that "This was part of ongoing research companies do to test different products, and that was what it was. It was poorly communicated and for that communication we apologize. We never meant to upset you."

Shortly thereafter, on July 3, 2014, USA Today reported that the privacy watchdog group Electronic Privacy Information Center (EPIC) had filed a formal complaint with the Federal Trade Commission claiming that Facebook had broken the law when it conducted the study on the emotions of its users without their knowledge or consent. In its complaint, EPIC alleged that Facebook had deceived users by secretly conducting a psychological experiment on their emotions: "At the time of the experiment, Facebook did not state in the Data Use Policy that user data would be used for research purposes. Facebook also failed to inform users that their personal information would be shared with researchers."

Beyond the ethical concerns, other scholars criticized the methods and reporting of the study's findings. John Grohol, writing for Psych Central, argued that despite its title and claims of "emotional contagion", this study did not look at emotions at all. Instead, its authors used an application (called "Linguistic Inquiry and Word Count" or LIWC 2007) that simply counted positive and negative words to infer users' sentiments. He wrote that a shortcoming of the LIWC tool is that it does not understand negations. Hence, the tweet "I am not happy" would be scored as positive: "Since the LIWC 2007 ignores these subtle realities of informal human communication, so do the researchers." Grohol concluded that given these subtleties, the effect size of the findings are little more than a "statistical blip".

Kramer et al. (2014) found a 0.07%—that's not 7 percent, that's 1/15th of one percent!!—decrease in negative words in people's status updates when the number of negative posts on their Facebook news feed decreased. Do you know how many words you'd have to read or write before you've written one less negative word due to this effect? Probably thousands.

The consequences of the controversy are pending (be it FTC or court proceedings) but it did prompt an "Editorial Expression of Concern" from its publisher, the Proceedings of the National Academy of Sciences, as well as a blog posting from OkCupid titled "We experiment on human beings!" In September 2014, law professor James Grimmelmann argued that the actions of both companies were "illegal, immoral, and mood-altering" and filed notices with the Maryland Attorney General and Cornell Institutional Review Board.

In the UK, the study was also criticized by the British Psychological Society which said, in a letter to The Guardian, "There has undoubtedly been some degree of harm caused, with many individuals affected by increased levels of negative emotion, with consequent potential economic costs, increase in possible mental health problems and burden on health services. The so-called 'positive' manipulation is also potentially harmful."

=== Internal research ===
A lawsuit alleged that the company "shut down internal research into the mental health effects of Facebook after finding causal evidence that its products harmed users’ mental health".

== Tax avoidance ==
Facebook uses a complicated series of shell companies in tax havens to avoid paying billions of dollars in corporate tax. According to The Express Tribune, Facebook is among the corporations that "avoided billions of dollars in tax using offshore companies." For example, Facebook routes billions of dollars in profits using the Double Irish and Dutch Sandwich tax avoidance schemes to bank accounts in the Cayman Islands. The Dutch newspaper NRC Handelsblad concluded from the Paradise Papers published in late 2017 that Facebook pays "practically no taxes" worldwide.

For example, Facebook paid:

- In 2011, £2.9m tax on £840m profits in the UK;
- In 2012 and 2013 no tax in the UK;
- In 2014 £4,327 tax on hundreds of millions of pounds in UK revenues which were transferred to tax havens.

According to economist and member of the PvdA delegation inside the Progressive Alliance of Socialists & Democrats in the European Parliament (S&D) Paul Tang, between 2013 and 2015 the EU lost an estimated €1,453m – €2,415m to Facebook. When comparing to others countries outside the EU, the EU is only taxing Facebook with a rate of 0.03% to 0.1% of its revenue (around 6% of its EBT) whereas this rate is near 28% in countries outside the EU. Even had a rate between 2% and 5% been applied during this period – as suggested by the ECOFIN Council – a fraud of this rate by Facebook would have meant a loss to the EU between €327m and €817m.

Revenues, profits, tax and effective tax rates, Facebook Inc. 2013–2015.
		Revenue (m EUR)			EBT (m EUR)			Tax (m EUR)			Tax / EBT			Tax / Revenue		
		Total	EU	Rest of the world	Total	EU	Rest of the world	Total	EU	Rest of the world	Total	EU	Rest of the world	Total	EU	Rest of the world
Facebook Inc.	2013	5,720	3,069	2,651	2,001	(4)	2,005	911	3	908	46%	n.a	45%	15.93%	0.10%	34.25%
	2014	10,299	5,017	5,282	4,057	(20)	4,077	1,628	5	1,623	40%	n.a	40%	15.81%	0.09%	30.73%
	2015	16,410	8,253	8,157	5,670	(43)	5,627	2,294	3	2,291	40%	6%	41%	13.98%	0.03%	28.09%

On July 6, 2016, the U.S. Department of Justice filed a petition in the U.S. District Court in San Francisco, asking for a court order to enforce an administrative summons issued to Facebook, Inc., under Internal Revenue Code section 7602, in connection with an Internal Revenue Service examination of Facebook's year 2010 U.S. Federal income tax return.

In November 2017, the Irish Independent recorded that for the 2016 financial year, Facebook had paid €30 million of Irish corporation tax on €12.6 billion of revenues that were routed through Ireland, giving an Irish effective tax rate of under 1%. The €12.6 billion of 2016 Facebook revenues routed through Ireland was almost half of Facebook's global revenues. In April 2018, Reuters wrote that all of Facebook's non–U.S. accounts were legally housed in Ireland for tax purposes, but were being moved due to the May 2018 EU GDPR regulations.

In November 2018, the Irish Times reported that Facebook routed over €18.7 billion of revenues through Ireland (almost half all global revenues), on which it paid €38 million of Irish corporation tax.

== Treatment of employees ==
=== Employees ===
The operational manager at Facebook as of March 2021, along with three former candidates of the Facebook hiring process complained to the EEOC of racial bias being practiced at the company against Black people. The current employee, Oscar Veneszee Jr. accused the firm of conducting subjective evaluations and pushing the idea of racial stereotypes. The EEOC has labeled the practice as "systemic" racial bias and has initiated an investigation.

Plans for a Facebook-owned real estate development known as "Willow Village" have been criticized for resembling a "company town", which often curtails the rights of residents, and encourages or forces employees to remain within an environment created and monitored by their employer outside of work hours. Critics have referred to the development as "Zucktown" and "Facebookville" and the company has faced additional criticism for the effect it will have on existing communities in California.

=== Moderators ===
Facebook hires some employees through contractors, including Accenture, Arvato, Cognizant, CPL Resources, Genpact, and Teleperformance, to serve as content moderators, reviewing potentially problematic content posted to both Facebook and Instagram. Many of these contractors face unrealistic expectations, harsh working conditions, and constant exposure to disturbing content, including graphic violence, animal abuse, and child pornography. Contractor employment is contingent on achieving and maintaining a score of 98 on a 100-point scale on a metric known as "accuracy". Falling below a score of 98 can result in dismissal. Some have reported post-traumatic stress disorder (PTSD) stemming from lack of access to counseling, coupled with unforgiving expectations and the violent content they are assigned to review.

Content moderator Keith Utley, who was employed by Cognizant, experienced a heart attack during work in March 2018; the office lacked a defibrillator, and Utley was transported to a hospital where he died. Selena Scola, an employee of contractor Pro Unlimited, Inc., sued her employer after she developed PTSD as a result of "constant and unmitigated exposure to highly toxic and extremely disturbing images at the workplace". In December 2019, former CPL employee Chris Gray began legal action in the High Court of Ireland, claiming damages for PTSD experienced as a moderator, the first of an estimated 20+ pending cases. In February 2020, employees in Tampa, Florida filed a lawsuit against Facebook and Cognizant alleging they developed PTSD and related mental health impairments as a result of constant and unmitigated exposure to disturbing content. In 2025, Meta's new moderation contractors in Ghana filed legal action against the company for similar issues. Workers reported developing mental illnesses, attempted self-harm and suicides, and poor working conditions.

In February 2020, the European Union Commissioners criticized the plans that Facebook has for dealing with the working conditions of those who are contracted to moderate content on the social media platform.

Facebook agreed to settle a class action lawsuit for $52 million on May 12, 2020, which included a $1,000 payment to each of the 11,250 moderators in the class, with additional compensation available for the treatment of PTSD and other conditions resulting from the jobs.

== Treatment of competitors ==
In May 2011, emails were sent to journalists and bloggers making critical allegations about Google's privacy policies; however, it was later discovered that the anti-Google campaign, conducted by PR giant Burson-Marsteller, was paid for by Facebook in what CNN referred to as "a new level skullduggery" and which Daily Beast called a "clumsy smear". While taking responsibility for the campaign, Burson-Marsteller said it should not have agreed to keep its client's (Facebook's) identity a secret. "Whatever the rationale, this was not at all standard operating procedure and is against our policies, and the assignment on those terms should have been declined", it said.

In December 2020, Apple Inc. announced an initiative of Anti-Tracking measures (opt-in tracking policy) to be introduced to their App Store Services. Facebook quickly reacted and started to criticise the initiative, claiming Apple's anti-tracking privacy focused change would have "harmful impact on many small businesses that are struggling to stay afloat and on the free internet that we all rely on more than ever". Facebook also launched a so-called "Speak Up For Small Businesses" page. Apple in their response stated that "users should know when their data is being collected and shared across other apps and websites – and they should have the choice to allow that or not". Apple was also backed up by the Electronic Frontier Foundation (EFF) who stated that "Facebook touts itself in this case as protecting small businesses, and that couldn't be further from the truth".

In March 2022, The Washington Post revealed that Facebook had partnered with Republican consulting firm Targeted Victory to orchestrate a campaign to damage the public reputation of competitor TikTok.

In December 2018 details on Facebook's behavior against competitors surfaced. The UK parliament member Damian Collins released files from a court ruling between Six4Three and Facebook. According to those files, the social media company Twitter released its app Vine in 2013. Facebook blocked Vine's Access to its data.

In July 2020, Facebook along with other tech giants Apple, Amazon and Google were accused of maintaining harmful power and anti-competitive strategies to quash potential competitors in the market. The CEOs of respective firms appeared in a teleconference on July 29, 2020, before the lawmakers of the United States Congress.

== Copying competitors' products and features ==
Beyond acquiring competitors in the social and messaging space with strong potential, Facebook often simply copies products or features to get to the market faster. Internal emails have shown that Facebook's leadership, including Mark Zuckerberg were frustrated by the time the company spends on prototyping, and suggested to explore copying entire products like Pinterest. "Copying is faster than innovating" – admitted an employee on the internal email thread, which continued: "If you gave the top-down order to go ahead, copy e.g. Pinterest or the gaming dynamics on Foursquare ... I am sure [a] very small team of engineers, a [product manager], and a designer would get it done super quickly."

Many Facebook employees seem to have questioned Facebook's approach of cloning competitors. According to leaks, a top quoted question in Facebook's internal all-hands was: "What is our next big product, which does not imitate already existing products on the market?"

In June 2014, Facebook launched Slingshot, an app for sending ephemeral photos like Snapchat does. In August 2016, the company released Facebook Stories, which is a copy of Snapchat's most popular feature.

In August 2020, Facebook built Instagram Reels, a feature that functioned and looked similar to TikTok. For several months, Facebook was experimenting with an app called Hobbi, which took many cues from Pinterest. In the summer of 2021, Facebook started to roll out Live Audio Rooms, which resembles Clubhouse.

== Content ==
Facebook or Meta Platforms has been criticized for its management of various content on posts, photos and entire groups and profiles. This includes but is not limited to allowing violent content, including content related to war crimes, and not limiting the spread of fake news and COVID-19 misinformation on their platform, as well as allowing incitement of violence against multiple groups.

=== Misguiding news publishers and advertisers on video engagement ===
Facebook heavily pushed news publishers towards making more videos and discouraging text content. However, this was revealed to be wrong as metrics used for time spent on videos was faulty overestimating by 60-80%, later unsealed court documents revealed the metric was wrong between 150-900% time. A group of advertisers in California sued Facebook over the allegation.

== Technical ==
=== Real-name policy controversy and compromise ===
Facebook has a real-name system policy for user profiles. The real-name policy stems from the position "that way, you always know who you're connecting with. This helps keep our community safe." The real-name system does not allow adopted names or pseudonyms, and in its enforcement has suspended accounts of legitimate users, until the user provides identification indicating the name. Facebook representatives have described these incidents as very rare. A user claimed responsibility via the anonymous Android and iOS app Secret for reporting "fake names" which caused user profiles to be suspended, specifically targeting the stage names of drag queens. On October 1, 2014, Chris Cox, Chief Product Officer at Facebook, offered an apology: "In the two weeks since the real-name policy issues surfaced, we've had the chance to hear from many of you in these communities and understand the policy more clearly as you experience it. We've also come to understand how painful this has been. We owe you a better service and a better experience using Facebook, and we're going to fix the way this policy gets handled so everyone affected here can go back to using Facebook as you were."

On December 15, 2015, Facebook announced in a press release that it would be providing a compromise to its real name policy after protests from groups such as the gay/lesbian community and abuse-victims. The site is developing a protocol that will allow members to provide specifics as to their "special circumstance" or "unique situation" with a request to use pseudonyms, subject to verification of their true identities. At that time, this was already being tested in the U.S. Product manager Todd Gage and vice president of global operations Justin Osofsky also promised a new method for reducing the number of members who must go through ID verification while ensuring the safety of others on Facebook. The fake name reporting procedure will also be modified, forcing anyone who makes such an allegation to provide specifics that would be investigated and giving the accused individual time to dispute the allegation.

=== Deleting users' statuses ===
There have been complaints of user statuses being mistakenly or intentionally deleted for alleged violations of Facebook's posting guidelines. Especially for non-English speaking writers, Facebook does not have a proper support system to genuinely read the content and make decisions. Sometimes the content of a status did not have any "abusive" or defaming language, but it nevertheless got deleted on the basis that it had been secretly reported by a group of people as "offensive". For other languages than English, Facebook until now is not able to identify the group approach that is used to vilify humanitarian activism. In another incident, Facebook had to apologize after it deleted a free speech group's post about the abuse of human rights in Syria. In that case, a spokesman for Facebook said the post was "mistakenly" removed by a member of its moderation team, which receives a high volume of take-down requests.

=== Enabling of harassment ===
Facebook instituted a policy by which it is now self-policed by the community of Facebook users. Some users have complained that this policy allows Facebook to empower abusive users to harass them by allowing them to submit reports on even benign comments and photos as being "offensive" or "in violation of Facebook Rights and Responsibilities" and that enough of these reports result in the user who is being harassed in this way getting their account blocked for a predetermined number of days or weeks, or even deactivated entirely.

Facebook UK policy director Simon Milner told Wired magazine that "Once the piece of content has been seen, assessed and deemed OK, (Facebook) will ignore further reports about it."

=== Lack of customer support ===
Facebook lacks any form of live customer support beyond "community" support pages and FAQ's which offer only general troubleshooting advice, often making it impossible to resolve issues that require the services of an administrator or are not covered in the FAQs. The automated emailing system used when filling out a support form often directs users back to the help center or to pages that are outdated and cannot be accessed, leaving users at a dead end with no further support available. A person who lost access to Facebook or does not have an account has no easy way to contact the company directly.

=== Downtime and outages ===
Facebook has had a number of outages and downtime large enough to draw some media attention. A 2007 outage resulted in a security hole that enabled some users to read other users' personal mail. In 2008, the site was inaccessible for about a day, from many locations in many countries. In spite of these occurrences, a report issued by Pingdom found that Facebook had less downtime in 2008 than most social-networking websites. On September 16, 2009, Facebook started having major problems loading as people signed in. This was due to a group of hackers deliberately trying to drown out a political speaker who had social networking problems from continuously speaking against the Iranian election results. Just two days later, on September 18, Facebook went down again.

In October 2009, an unspecified number of Facebook users were unable to access their accounts for over three weeks.

On Monday, October 4, 2021, Facebook and its other apps – Instagram, WhatsApp, Messenger, Oculus, as well as the lesser-known Mapillary – had an hours-long DNS-related global outage. The outage also affected anyone using "Log in with Facebook" to access third-party sites. The downtime lasted approximately five hours and fifteen minutes, from approximately 15:50 UTC to 21:05 UTC, and affected roughly three billion users. The outage was caused by a BGP withdrawal of all of the IP routes to their Domain Name (DNS) servers, which were all self-hosted at the time.

A further global outage occurred on Tuesday, March 5, 2024. Facebook, Instagram, Threads and Messenger suddenly stopped working worldwide at 15:00 UTC, ending two hours later. The outage appeared on Super Tuesday, a day of many presidential primary elections in the United States. The cause of the outage was reportedly related to a problem with an automated tool for fixing configuration values. Twitter CEO Elon Musk mocked the outage in X.

=== Tracking cookies ===
Facebook has been criticized heavily for 'tracking' users, even when logged out of the site. Australian technologist Nik Cubrilovic discovered that when a user logs out of Facebook, the cookies from that login are still kept in the browser, allowing Facebook to track users on websites that include "social widgets" distributed by the social network. Facebook has denied the claims, saying they have 'no interest' in tracking users or their activity. They also promised after the discovery of the cookies that they would remove them, saying they will no longer have them on the site. A group of users in the United States have sued Facebook for breaching privacy laws.

As of December 2015, to comply with a court order citing violations of the European Union Directive on Privacy and Electronic Communications – which requires users to consent to tracking and storage of data by websites, Facebook no longer allows users in Belgium to view any content on the service, even public pages, without being registered and logged in.

=== Email address change ===
In June 2012, Facebook removed all existing email addresses from user profiles, and added a new @facebook.com email address. Facebook claimed this was part of adding a "new setting that gives people the choice to decide which addresses they want to show on their timelines". However, this setting was redundant to the existing "Only Me" privacy setting which was already available to hide addresses from timelines. Users complained the change was unnecessary, they did not want an @facebook.com email address, and they did not receive adequate notification their profiles had been changed. The change in email address was synchronized to phones due to a software bug, causing existing email addresses details to be deleted. The facebook.com email service was retired in February 2014.

=== Safety Check bug ===
On March 27, 2016, following a bombing in Lahore, Pakistan, Facebook activated its "Safety Check" feature, which allows people to let friends and loved ones know they are okay following a crisis or natural disaster, to people who were never in danger, or even close to the Pakistan explosion. Some users as far as the US, UK and Egypt received notifications asking if they were okay.

=== End-to-end encryption ===
In February 2021, the National Crime Agency of the UK expressed its concerns that the installation of end-to-end encryption methods would result in the spread of child pornography going undetected. Facebook representatives had previously told a UK Parliament committee that the use of these stronger encryption methods would render it easier for pedophiles to share child pornography on Facebook's networks. The US-based National Center for Missing and Exploited Children estimates that around 70% of reports to law enforcement regarding the spread of child pornography on Facebook would be lost as a result of the implementation of end-to-end encryption.

In May 2021, Facebook came under fire from Ken McCallum, the Director-General of MI5, for its plans to introduce end-to-end encryption into its Messenger and Instagram services. McCallum stated that the introduction of such encryption methods would prevent security organizations from viewing communications related to ongoing terrorist plots and that the implementation of end-to-end encryption would block active counter-terrorism investigations.

=== Banning accounts ===
On July 3, 2025, BBC reported that Facebook and Instagram users had their accounts arbitrarily banned. A petition accused that AI was in the handling of both the operation and appeals. Accounts were occasionally reinstated when BBC inquired Meta about those cases.

== Third-party responses to Facebook ==
=== Government censorship ===
Several countries have banned access to Facebook, including Syria, China, and Iran. In 2010, the Office of the Data Protection Supervisor, a branch of the government of the Isle of Man, received so many complaints about Facebook that they deemed it necessary to provide a "Facebook Guidance" booklet (available online as a PDF file), which cited (amongst other things) Facebook policies and guidelines and included an elusive Facebook telephone number. This number when called, however, proved to provide no telephone support for Facebook users, and only played back a recorded message advising callers to review Facebook's online help information.

In 2010, Facebook reportedly allowed an objectionable page, deemed by the Islamic Lawyers Forum (ILF), to be anti-Muslim. The ILF filed a petition with Pakistan's Lahore High Court. On May 18, 2010, Justice Ijaz Ahmad Chaudhry ordered Pakistan's Telecommunication Authority to block access to Facebook until May 31. The offensive page had provoked street demonstrations in Muslim countries due to visual depictions of Muhammad, which are regarded as blasphemous by Muslims. A spokesman said Pakistan Telecommunication Authority would move to implement the ban once the order has been issued by the Ministry of Information and Technology. "We will implement the order as soon as we get the instructions", Khurram Mehran told AFP. "We have already blocked the URL link and issued instruction to Internet service providers yesterday", he added. Rai Bashir told AFP that "We moved the petition in the wake of widespread resentment in the Muslim community against the Facebook contents". The petition called on the government of Pakistan to lodge a strong protest with the owners of Facebook, he added. Bashir said a PTA official told the judge his organization had blocked the page, but the court ordered a total ban on the site. People demonstrated outside court in the eastern city of Lahore, Pakistan, carrying banners condemning Facebook. Protests in Pakistan on a larger scale took place after the ban and widespread news of that objectionable page. The ban was lifted on May 31 after Facebook reportedly assured the Lahore High Court that it would remedy the issues in dispute.

In 2011, a court in Pakistan was petitioned to place a permanent ban on Facebook for hosting a page called "2nd Annual Draw Muhammad Day May 20th 2011".

=== Government fines ===
In July 2024, Nigeria's government slapped Meta with a $220 million fine for violating the country's data protection and consumer rights laws on Facebook and WhatsApp. According to Nigeria's Federal Competition and Consumer Protection Commission (FCCPC), Meta broke the rules in five major ways: sharing Nigerian users' data without permission, denying consumers control over their data, practicing discrimination, and abusing market dominance.

=== Organizations blocking user access to Facebook ===
Ontario government employees, Federal public servants, MPPs, and cabinet ministers were blocked from access to Facebook on government computers in May 2007. When the employees tried to access Facebook, a warning message "The Internet website that you have requested has been deemed unacceptable for use for government business purposes". This warning also appears when employees try to access YouTube, MySpace, gambling or pornographic websites. However, innovative employees have found ways around such protocols, and many claim to use the site for political or work-related purposes.

A number of local governments including those in the UK and Finland imposed restrictions on the use of Facebook in the workplace due to the technical strain incurred. Other government-related agencies, such as the US Marine Corps have imposed similar restrictions. A number of hospitals in Finland have also restricted Facebook use citing privacy concerns.

The University of New Mexico (UNM) in October 2005 blocked access to Facebook from UNM campus computers and networks, citing unsolicited emails and a similar site called UNM Facebook. After a UNM user signed into Facebook from off campus, a message from Facebook said, "We are working with the UNM administration to lift the block and have explained that it was instituted based on erroneous information, but they have not yet committed to restore your access." UNM, in a message to students who tried to access the site from the UNM network, wrote, "This site is temporarily unavailable while UNM and the site owners work out procedural issues. The site is in violation of UNM's Acceptable Computer Use Policy for abusing computing resources (e.g., spamming, trademark infringement, etc.). The site forces use of UNM credentials (e.g., NetID or email address) for non-UNM business." However, after Facebook created an encrypted login and displayed a precautionary message not to use university passwords for access, UNM unblocked access the following spring semester.

The Columbus Dispatch reported on June 22, 2006, that Kent State University's athletic director had planned to ban the use of Facebook by athletes and gave them until August 1 to delete their accounts. On July 5, 2006, the Daily Kent Stater reported that the director reversed the decision after reviewing the privacy settings of Facebook. As long as they followed the university's policies of online conduct, they could keep their profiles.

=== Closed social networks ===
Several web sites concerned with social networking, such as Salesforce have criticized the lack of information that users get when they share data. Advanced users cannot limit the amount of information anyone can access in their profiles, but Facebook promotes the sharing of personal information for marketing purposes, leading to the promotion of the service using personal data from users who are not fully aware of this. Facebook exposes personal data, without supporting open standards for data interchange. According to several communities and authors closed social networking, on the other hand, promotes data retrieval from other people while not exposing one's personal information.

Openbook was established in early 2010 both as a parody of Facebook and a critique of its changing privacy management protocols.

=== Browser extensions to reduce use ===
Fluff Busting Purity, or FB Purity for short (previously known as Facebook Purity) is a browser extension first launched in 2009 to allow users to remove annoyances such as spam from their feed and allow more individual control over what content is displayed. In response, Facebook banned its developer from using the platform and blocked links to the extension.

Unfollow Everything is a browser extension designed to help Facebook users reduce their time spent on the platform by mass unliking to reduce the clutter in their news feed. The extension, together with its creator, has been banned by Facebook and subject to legal warnings.

In 2024, Ethan Zuckerman, an associate professor at University of Massachusetts Amherst filed a suit against Meta in federal court to establish the legality of a hypothetical Unfollow Everything 2.0 browser extension. The case was dismissed on procedural grounds in November 2024.

== Litigation ==
Meta Platforms, formerly Facebook, Inc., has been involved in many lawsuits since its founding in 2004.

== Lobbying ==
Facebook is among the biggest spenders on lobbying among tech companies; in 2020, it was the highest spender. It spent more than $80 million on lobbying in the 2010s. This funding may serve to weaken privacy protections.

In March 2019, HuffPost reported that Facebook paid lawyer Ed Sussman to lobby for changes to their Wikipedia articles.

In December 2021, news broke on The Wall Street Journal pointing to Meta's lobbying efforts to divide US lawmakers and "muddy the waters" in Congress, to hinder regulation following the 2021 whistleblower leaks. Facebook's lobbyist team in Washington suggested to Republican lawmakers that the whistleblower "was trying to help Democrats," while the narrative told to Democratic staffers was that Republicans "were focused on the company's decision to ban expressions of support for Kyle Rittenhouse," The Wall Street Journal reported. According to the article, the company's goal was to "muddy the waters, divide lawmakers along partisan lines and forestall a cross-party alliance" against Facebook (now Meta) in Congress.

In March 2022, the Washington Post reported that Meta had hired the Republican-backed consulting firm Targeted Victory to coordinate lobbying and negative PR against the video app TikTok via local media outlets, including concurrent promotion of corporate initiatives conducted by Facebook.

== Terms of use controversy ==
While Facebook originally made changes to its terms of use or, terms of service, on February 4, 2009, the changes went unnoticed until Chris Walters, a blogger for the consumer-oriented blog, The Consumerist, noticed the change on February 15, 2009. Walters complained the change gave Facebook the right to "Do anything they want with your content. Forever." The section under the most controversy is the "User Content Posted on the Site" clause. Before the changes, the clause read:

You may remove your User Content from the Site at any time. If you choose to remove your User Content, the license granted above will automatically expire, however you acknowledge that the Company may retain archived copies of your User Content.

The "license granted" refers to the license that Facebook has to one's "name, likeness, and image" to use in promotions and external advertising. The new terms of use deleted the phrase that states the license would "automatically expire" if a user chose to remove content. By omitting this line, Facebook license extends to adopt users' content perpetually and irrevocably years after the content has been deleted.

Many users of Facebook voiced opinions against the changes to the Facebook Terms of Use, leading to an Internet-wide debate over the ownership of content. The Electronic Privacy Information Center (EPIC) prepared a formal complaint with the Federal Trade Commission. Many individuals were frustrated with the removal of the controversial clause. Facebook users, numbering more than 38,000, joined a user group against the changes, and a number of blogs and news sites have written about this issue.

After the change was brought to light in Walters's blog entry, in his blog on February 16, 2009, Zuckerberg addressed the issues concerning the recently made changes to Facebook's terms of use. Zuckerberg wrote "Our philosophy is that people own their information and control who they share it with." In addition to this statement Zuckerberg explained the paradox created when people want to share their information (phone number, pictures, email address, etc.) with the public, but at the same time desire to remain in complete control of who has access to this info.

To calm criticism, Facebook returned to its original terms of use. However, on February 17, 2009, Zuckerberg wrote in his blog, that although Facebook reverted to its original terms of use, it is in the process of developing new terms to address the paradox. Zuckerberg stated that these new terms will allow Facebook users to "share and control their information, and it will be written clearly in language everyone can understand." Zuckerberg invited users to join a group entitled "Facebook Bill of Rights and Responsibilities" to give their input and help shape the new terms.

On February 26, 2009, Zuckerberg posted a blog, updating users on the progress of the new Terms of Use. He wrote, "We decided we needed to do things differently and so we're going to develop new policies that will govern our system from the ground up in an open and transparent way." Zuckerberg introduces the two new additions to Facebook: the Facebook Principles and the Statement of Rights and Responsibilities. Both additions allow users to vote on changes to the terms of use before they are officially released. Because "Facebook is still in the business of introducing new and therefore potentially disruptive technologies", Zuckerberg explains, users need to adjust and familiarize themselves with the products before they can adequately show their support.

This new voting system was initially applauded as Facebook's step to a more democratized social network system. However, the new terms were harshly criticized in a report by computer scientists from the University of Cambridge, who stated that the democratic process surrounding the new terms is disingenuous and significant problems remain in the new terms. The report was endorsed by the Open Rights Group.

In December 2009, EPIC and a number of other U.S. privacy organizations filed another complaint with the Federal Trade Commission (FTC) regarding Facebook's Terms of Service. In January 2011 EPIC filed a subsequent complaint claiming that Facebook's new policy of sharing users' home address and mobile phone information with third-party developers were "misleading and fail[ed] to provide users clear and privacy protections", particularly for children under age 18. Facebook temporarily suspended implementation of its policy in February 2011, but the following month announced it was "actively considering" reinstating the third-party policy.

== Interoperability and data portability ==
Facebook has been criticized for failing to offer users a feature to export their friends' information, such as contact information, for use with other services or software. The inability of users to export their social graph in an open standard format contributes to vendor lock-in and contravenes the principles of data portability. Automated collection of user information without Facebook's consent violates its Statement of Rights and Responsibilities, and third-party attempts to do so (e.g., Web scraping) have resulted in litigation, Power.com.

Facebook Connect has been criticized for its lack of interoperability with OpenID.

=== Lawsuits over privacy ===
Facebook's strategy of making revenue through advertising has created a lot of controversy for its users as some argue that it is "a bit creepy ... but it is also brilliant." Some Facebook users have raised privacy concerns because they do not like that Facebook sells user's information to third parties. In 2012, users sued Facebook for using their pictures and information on a Facebook advertisement. Facebook gathers user information by keeping track of pages users have "Liked" and through the interactions users have with their connections. They then create value from the gathered data by selling it. In 2009 users also filed a lawsuit for Facebook's privacy invasion through the Facebook Beacon system. Facebook's team believed that through the Beacon system people could inspire their friends to buy similar products, however, users did not like the idea of sharing certain online purchases with their Facebook friends. Users were against Facebook's invasion of privacy and sharing that privacy with the world. Facebook users became more aware of Facebook's behavior with user information in 2009 as Facebook launched their new Terms of Service. In Facebook's terms of service, Facebook admits that user information may be used for some of Facebook's own purposes such as sharing a link to your posted images or for their own commercials and advertisements.

As Dijck argues in his book that, "the more users know about what happens to their personal data, the more inclined they are to raise objections." This created a battle between Facebook and Facebook users described as the "battle for information control". Facebook users have become aware of Facebook's intentions and people now see Facebook "as serving the interests of companies rather than its users." In response to Facebook selling user information to third parties, concerned users have resorted to the method of "Obfuscation". Through obfuscation users can purposely hide their real identity and provide Facebook with false information that will make their collected data less accurate. By obfuscating information through sites such as FaceCloak, Facebook users have regained control of their personal information.

== Better Business Bureau review ==
As of December 2010, the Better Business Bureau gave Facebook an "A" rating.

As of December 2010, the 36-month running count of complaints about Facebook logged with the Better Business Bureau is 1136, including 101 ("Making a full refund, as the consumer requested"), 868 ("Agreeing to perform according to their contract"), 1 ("Refuse [sic] to adjust, relying on terms of agreement"), 20 ("Unassigned"), 0 ("Unanswered") and 136 ("Refusing to make an adjustment").

== Security ==
Facebook's software has proven vulnerable to likejacking. On July 28, 2010, the BBC reported that security consultant Ron Bowes used a piece of code to scan Facebook profiles to collect data of 100 million profiles. The data collected was not hidden by the user's privacy settings. Bowes then published the list online. This list, which has been shared as a downloadable file, contains the URL of every searchable Facebook user's profile, their name and unique ID. Bowes said he published the data to highlight privacy issues, but Facebook claimed it was already public information.

In early June 2013, The New York Times reported that an increase in malicious links related to the Trojan horse malware program Zeus were identified by Eric Feinberg, founder of the advocacy group Fans Against Kounterfeit Enterprise (FAKE). Feinberg said that the links were present on popular NFL Facebook fan pages and, following contact with Facebook, was dissatisfied with the corporation's "after-the-fact approach". Feinberg called for oversight, stating, "If you really want to hack someone, the easiest place to start is a fake Facebook profile—it's so simple, it's stupid."

=== Rewards for vulnerability reporting ===
On August 19, 2013, it was reported that a Facebook user from Palestinian Autonomy, Khalil Shreateh, found a bug that allowed him to post material to other users' Facebook Walls. Users are not supposed to have the ability to post material to the Facebook Walls of other users unless they are approved friends of those users that they have posted material to. To prove that he was telling the truth, Shreateh posted material to Sarah Goodin's wall, a friend of Facebook CEO Mark Zuckerberg. Following this, Shreateh contacted Facebook's security team with the proof that his bug was real, explaining in detail what was going on. Facebook has a bounty program in which it compensates people a $500+ fee for reporting bugs instead of using them to their advantage or selling them on the black market. However, it was reported that instead of fixing the bug and paying Shreateh the fee, Facebook originally told him that "this was not a bug" and dismissed him. Shreateh then tried a second time to inform Facebook, but they dismissed him yet again. On the third try, Shreateh used the bug to post a message to Mark Zuckerberg's Wall, stating "Sorry for breaking your privacy ... but a couple of days ago, I found a serious Facebook exploit" and that Facebook's security team was not taking him seriously. Within minutes, a security engineer contacted Shreateh, questioned him on how he performed the move and ultimately acknowledged that it was a bug in the system. Facebook temporarily suspended Shreateh's account and fixed the bug after several days. However, in a move that was met with much public criticism and disapproval, Facebook refused to pay out the 500+ fee to Shreateh; instead, Facebook responded that by posting to Zuckerberg's account, Shreateh had violated one of their terms of service policies and therefore "could not be paid". Included with this, the Facebook team strongly censured Shreateh over his manner of resolving the matter. In closing, they asked that Shreateh continue to help them find bugs.

On August 22, 2013, Yahoo News reported that Marc Maiffret, a chief technology officer of the cybersecurity firm BeyondTrust, is prompting hackers to help raise a $10,000 reward for Khalil Shreateh. On August 20, Maiffret stated that he had already raised $9,000 in his efforts, including the $2,000 he himself contributed. He and other hackers alike have denounced Facebook for refusing Shreateh compensation. Maiffret said: "He is sitting there in Palestine doing this research on a five-year-old laptop that looks like it is half broken. It's something that might help him out in a big way." Facebook representatives have since responded, "We will not change our practice of refusing to pay rewards to researchers who have tested vulnerabilities against real users." Facebook representatives also claimed they'd paid out over $1 million to individuals who have discovered bugs in the past.

== Environmental impacts ==
In 2010, Prineville, Oregon, was chosen as the site for Facebook's new data center. However, the center has been met with criticism from environmental groups such as Greenpeace because the power utility company contracted for the center, PacifiCorp, generates 60% of its electricity from coal. In September 2010, Facebook received a letter from Greenpeace containing half a million signatures asking the company to cut its ties to coal-based electricity.

On April 21, 2011, Greenpeace released a report showing that of the top ten big brands in cloud computing, Facebook relied the most on coal for electricity for its data centers. At the time, data centers consumed up to 2% of all global electricity and this amount was projected to increase. Phil Radford of Greenpeace said "we are concerned that this new explosion in electricity use could lock us into old, polluting energy sources instead of the clean energy available today".

On December 15, 2011, Greenpeace and Facebook announced together that Facebook would shift to use clean and renewable energy to power its own operations. Marcy Scott Lynn, of Facebook's sustainability program, said it looked forward "to a day when our primary energy sources are clean and renewable" and that the company is "working with Greenpeace and others to help bring that day closer".

In April 2022, Meta Platforms, Alphabet Inc., Shopify, McKinsey & Company, and Stripe, Inc. announced a $925 million Advance market commitment of carbon dioxide removal (CDR) from companies that are developing CDR technology over the next 9 years. In January 2023, the American Clean Power Association released an annual industry report that found that 326 corporations had contracted 77.4 gigawatts of wind or solar energy by the end of 2022 and that the three corporate purchasers of the largest volumes of wind and solar energy were Meta Platforms, Amazon, and Alphabet Inc.

== Advertising ==
=== Click fraud ===
In July 2012, startup Limited Run claimed that 80% of its Facebook clicks came from bots. Limited Run co-founder Tom Mango told TechCrunch that they "spent roughly a month testing this" with six web analytics services including Google Analytics and in-house software. Click fraud (Allege reason) Limited Run said it came to the conclusion that the clicks were fraudulent after running its own analysis. It determined that most of the clicks for which Facebook was charging it came from computers that were not loading JavaScript, a programming language that allows Web pages to be interactive. Almost all Web browsers load JavaScript by default, so the assumption is that if a click comes from one that is not, it's probably not a real person but a bot.

=== Like fraud ===
Facebook offers an advertising tool for pages to get more "likes". According to Business Insider, this advertising tool is called "Suggested Posts" or "Suggested Pages", allowing companies to market their page to thousands of new users for as little as $50.

Global Fortune 100 firms are increasingly using social media marketing tools as the number of "likes" per Facebook page has risen by 115% globally. Biotechnology company Comprendia investigated Facebook's "likes" through advertising by analyzing the life science pages with the most likes. They concluded that at as much as 40% of "likes" from company pages are suspected to be fake. According to Facebook's annual report, an estimated 0.4% and 1.2% of active users are undesirable accounts that create fake likes.

Small companies such as PubChase have publicly testified against Facebook's advertising tool, claiming legitimate advertising on Facebook creates fraudulent Facebook "likes". In May 2013, PubChase decided to build up its Facebook following through Facebook's advertising tool, which promises to "connect with more of the people who matter to you". After the first day, the company grew suspicious of the increased likes as they ended up with 900 likes from India. According to PubChase, none of the users behind the "likes" seemed to be scientists. The statistics from Google Analytics indicate that India is not in the company's main user base. PubChase continues by stating that Facebook has no interface to delete the fake likes; rather, the company must manually delete each follower themselves.

In February 2014, Derek Muller used his YouTube account Veritasium to upload a video titled "Facebook Fraud". Within three days, the video had gone viral with more than a million views (it has reached 6,371,759 views as of December 15, 2021). In the video, Derek illustrates how after paying US$50 to Facebook advertising, the "likes" to his fan page have tripled in a few days and soon reached 70,000 "likes", compared to his original 2,115 likes before the advertising. Despite the significant increase in likes, Derek noticed his page has actually decreased in engagement – there were fewer people commenting, sharing, and liking his posts and updates despite the significant increase in "likes". Derek also noticed that the users that "liked" his page were users that liked hundreds of other pages, including competing pages such as AT&T and T-Mobile. He theorizes that users are purposely clicking "like" on any and every page to deter attention away from the pages they were paid to "like". Derek claims, "I never bought fake likes, I used Facebook legitimate advertising, but the results are as if I paid for fake likes from a click farm".

In response to the fake "likes" complaints, Facebook told Business Insider:

We're always focused on maintaining the integrity of our site, but we've placed an increased focus on abuse from fake accounts recently. We've made a lot of progress by building a combination of automated and manual systems to block accounts used for fraudulent purposes and Like button clicks. We also take action against sellers of fake clicks and help shut them down.

=== Undesired targeting ===
On August 3, 2007, several British companies, including First Direct, Vodafone, Virgin Media, The Automobile Association, Halifax and Prudential pulled advertising in Facebook after finding that their ads were displayed on the page of the British National Party, a far-right political party.

=== Internal projections ===
In 2024, Facebook's internal projections showed ~10% of its revenue that year would come from "ads for scams and banned goods" with 15 billion “higher risk” ads shown daily. A spokesperson responded that the estimates were "rough and overly-inclusive".

=== Facilitation of housing discrimination ===
Facebook has faced allegations that its advertising platforms facilitate housing discrimination by means of internal functions for targeted advertising, which allowed advertisers to target or exclude specific audiences from campaigns. Researchers have also found that Facebook's advertising platform may be inherently discriminatory, since ad delivery is also influenced by how often specific demographics interact with specific types of advertising – even if they are not explicitly determined by the advertiser.

Under the United States' Fair Housing Act, it is illegal to show a preference for or against tenants based on specific protected classes (including race, ethnicity, and disabilities), when advertising or negotiating the rental or sale of housing. In 2016, ProPublica found that advertisers could target or exclude users from advertising based on an "Ethnic Affinity" – a demographic trait which is determined based on a user's interests and behaviors on Facebook, and not explicitly provided by the user. This could, in turn, be used to discriminate based on race. In February 2017, Facebook stated that it would implement stronger measures to forbid discriminatory advertising across the entire platform. Advertisers who attempt to create ads for housing, employment, or credit (HEC) opportunities would be blocked from using ethnic affinities (renamed "multicultural affinities" and now classified as behaviors) to target the ad. If an advertiser uses any other audience segment to target ads for HEC, they would be informed of the policies, and be required to affirm their compliance with relevant laws and policies.

However, in November 2017, ProPublica found that automated enforcement of these new policies was inconsistent. They were also able to successfully create housing ads that excluded users based on interests and other factors that effectively imply associations with protected classes, including interests in wheelchair ramps, the Spanish-language television network Telemundo, and New York City ZIP codes with majority minority populations. In response to the report, Facebook temporarily removed the ability to target any ad with exclusions based on multicultural affinities.

In April 2018, Facebook permanently removed the ability to create exclusions based on multicultural affinities. In July 2018, Facebook signed a legally binding agreement with the State of Washington to take further steps within 90 days to prevent the use of its advertising platform for housing discrimination against protected classes. The following month, Facebook announced that it would remove at least 5,000 categories from its exclusion system to prevent "misuse", including those relating to races and religions. On March 19, 2019, Facebook settled a lawsuit over the matter with the National Fair Housing Alliance, agreeing to create a separate portal for HEC advertising with limited targeting options by September 2019, and to provide a public archive of all HEC advertising.

On March 28, 2019, the U.S. Department of Housing and Urban Development (HUD) filed a lawsuit against Facebook, having filed a formal complaint against the company on August 13, 2018. The HUD also took issue with Facebook's tendency to deliver ads based on users having "particular characteristics [that are] most likely to engage with the ad".

== Fake accounts ==
In August 2012, Facebook revealed that more than 83 million Facebook accounts (8.7% of total users) are fake accounts. These fake profiles consist of duplicate profiles, accounts for spamming purposes and personal profiles for business, organization or non-human entities such as pets. As a result of this revelation, the share price of Facebook dropped below $20. As of 2026, Facebook faces significant criticism for its increasingly aggressive automated enforcement systems. While designed to neutralize millions of fake accounts daily, these AI-driven "purification phases" frequently result in false positives that penalize legitimate, long-standing users. In early 2026, over 50,000 users signed a petition calling for Meta to be held accountable for wrongly disabling accounts. Users reported being accused of serious violations (e.g., child exploitation) despite having no such content, leading to permanent loss of personal and business profiles.

Facebook initially refused to remove a "business" page devoted to a woman's anus, created without her knowledge while she was underage, due to other Facebook users having expressed interest in the topic. After BuzzFeed published a story about it, the page was finally removed. The page listed her family's former home address as that of the "business".

== User interface ==
=== Upgrades ===
==== September 2008 ====
In September 2008, Facebook permanently moved its users to what they termed the "New Facebook" or Facebook 3.0. This version contained several different features and a complete layout redesign. Between July and September, users had been given the option to use the new Facebook in place of the original design, or to return to the old design.

Facebook's decision to migrate their users was met with some controversy in their community. Several groups started opposing the decision, some with over a million users.

==== October 2009 ====
In October 2009, Facebook redesigned the news feed so that the user could view all types of things that their friends were involved with. In a statement, they said,

your applications [stories] generate can show up in both views. The best way for your stories to appear in the News Feed filter is to create stories that are highly engaging, as high quality, interesting stories are most likely to garner likes and comments by the user's friends.

This redesign was explained as:

News Feed will focus on popular content, determined by an algorithm based on interest in that story, including the number of times an item is liked or commented on. Live Feed will display all recent stories from a large number of a user's friends.

The redesign was met immediately with criticism with users, many who did not like the amount of information that was coming at them. This was also compounded by the fact that people could not select what they saw.

==== November/December 2009 ====
In November 2009, Facebook issued a proposed new privacy policy, and adopted it unaltered in December 2009. They combined this with a rollout of new privacy settings. This new policy declared certain information, including "lists of friends", to be "publicly available", with no privacy settings; it was previously possible to keep access to this information restricted. Due to this change, the users who had set their "list of friends" as private were forced to make it public without even being informed, and the option to make it private again was removed. This was protested by many people and privacy organizations such as the EFF.

The change was described by Ryan Tate as Facebook's Great Betrayal, forcing user profile photos and friends lists to be visible in users' public listing, even for users who had explicitly chosen to hide this information previously, and making photos and personal information public unless users were proactive about limiting access. For example, a user whose "Family and Relationships" information was set to be viewable by "Friends Only" would default to being viewable by "Everyone" (publicly viewable). That is, information such as the gender of the partner the user is interested in, relationship status, and family relations became viewable to those even without a Facebook account. Facebook was heavily criticized for both reducing its users' privacy and pushing users to remove privacy protections. Groups criticizing the changes include the Electronic Frontier Foundation and American Civil Liberties Union. Mark Zuckerberg, CEO, had hundreds of personal photos and his events calendar exposed in the transition. Facebook has since re-included an option to hide friends lists from being viewable; however, this preference is no longer listed with other privacy settings, and the former ability to hide the friends list from selected people among one's own friends is no longer possible. Journalist Dan Gillmor deleted his Facebook account over the changes, stating he "can't entirely trust Facebook" and Heidi Moore at Slate's Big Money temporarily deactivated her account as a "conscientious objection". Other journalists have been similarly disappointed and outraged by the changes. Defending the changes, founder Mark Zuckerberg said "we decided that these would be the social norms now and we just went for it". The Office of the Privacy Commissioner of Canada launched another investigation into Facebook's privacy policies after complaints following the change.

==== January 2018 ====
Following a difficult 2017, marked by accusations of relaying fake news and revelations about groups close to Russia which tried to influence the 2016 US presidential election (see Russian interference in the 2016 United States elections) via advertisements on his service, Mark Zuckerberg, announced in his traditional January post:

"We're making a major change to how we build Facebook. I'm changing the goal I give our product teams from focusing on helping you find relevant content to helping you have more meaningful social interactions".

— Mark Zuckerberg

Following surveys on Facebook users, this desire for change will take the form of a reconfiguration of the News Feed algorithms to:

- Prioritize content of family members and friends (Mark Zuckerberg January 12, Facebook: "The first changes you'll see will be in News Feed, where you can expect to see more from your friends, family and groups".)
- Give priority to news articles from local sources considered more credible

The recent changes of the News Feed algorithm (see content : News Feed#History) are expected to improve "the amount of meaningful content viewed". To this end, the new algorithm is supposed to determine the publications around which a user is most likely to interact with his friends, and make them appear higher in the News Feed instead of items for example from media companies or brands. These are posts "that inspire back-and-forth discussion in the comments and posts that you might want to share and react to". But, as even Mark Zuckerberg admitted, he "expect the time people spend on Facebook and some measures of engagement will go down. But I also expect the time you do spend on Facebook will be more valuable". The less public content a Facebook user sees on their News Feed, the fewer brands are able to reach consumers. That's unarguably a major lose for advertisers and publishers.

This change which seems to be just another update of the social network, is widely criticized because of the heavy consequences it might lead to "In countries such as the Philippines, Myanmar and South Sudan and emerging democracies such Bolivia and Serbia, it is not ethical to plead platform neutrality or to set up the promise of a functioning news ecosystem and then simply withdraw at a whim". Indeed, in such countries, Facebook was the promise of a reliable and objective platform on which they could hope for raw information. Independent media companies tried to fight censorship through their articles and were promoting in a way the right for citizens to know what is going on in their countries.

The company's way of handling scandals and criticism over fake news by diminishing its media company image is even defined as "potentially deadly" regarding the poor and fraught political environments like Myanmar or South Sudan appealed by the "free basics" programme of the social network. Serbian journalist Stevan Dojčinović goes further by describing Facebook as a "monster" and accuses the company of "showing a cynical lack of concern for how its decisions affect the most vulnerable". Indeed, Facebook had experimented with withdrawing media companies' news on user's newsfeed in few countries such as Serbia. Stevan Docjcinovic then wrote an article explaining how Facebook helped them "to bypass mainstream channels and bring [their] stories to hundreds of thousands of readers". The rule about publishers is not being applied to paid posts raising the journalist's fears about the social network "becoming just another playground for the powerful" by letting them for example buy Facebook ads. Critics are also visible in other media companies depicting the private company as the "destroyer of worlds". LittleThings CEO, Joe Speiser states that the algorithm shift "took out roughly 75% of LittleThings" organic traffic while hammering its profit margins" compelling them to close their doors because they were relying on Facebook to share content.

== Net neutrality ==
=== "Free Basics" controversy in India ===
In February 2016, TRAI ruled against differential data pricing for limited services from mobile phone operators effectively ending zero-rating platforms in India. Zero rating provides access to a limited number of websites for no charge to the end user. Net-neutrality supporters from India (SaveTheInternet.in) brought out the negative implications of the Facebook Free Basic program and spread awareness to the public. Facebook's Free Basics program was a collaboration with Reliance Communications to launch Free Basics in India. The TRAI ruling against differential pricing marked the end of Free Basics in India.

Earlier, Facebook had spent US$44 million in advertising and it implored all of its Indian users to send an email to the Telecom Regulatory Authority to support its program. TRAI later asked Facebook to provide specific responses from the supporters of Free Basics.

== Influence on elections ==
In what is known as the Facebook–Cambridge Analytica data scandal, Facebook users were targeted with political advertising without informed consent in an attempt to promote right-wing causes, including the presidential election of Donald Trump. In addition to elections in the United States, Facebook has been implicated in electoral influence campaigns in places like Argentina, Kenya, Malaysia, the United Kingdom, and South Africa, as discussed in the 2019 documentary The Great Hack.

== Blocking news in Canada ==
In response to the Online News Act, Meta Platforms began blocking access to news sites for Canadian users at the beginning of August 2023. This also extended to local Canadian news stories about the wildfires, a decision that was heavily criticized by Trudeau, local government officials, academics, researchers, and evacuees. Ollie Williams of Yellowknife's Cabin Radio said that users had to resort to posting screenshots of news stories, as posting news directly would result in the link getting blocked. Meta responded to these criticisms by stating that Canadians "can continue to use our technologies to connect with their communities and access reputable information […] from official government agencies, emergency services and non-governmental organizations," and encouraged them to use Facebook's Safety Check feature.

== Donald Trump ==
Following repeated threats from Donald Trump to jail Zuckerburg, the company ended its third party fact-checking program. In January 2025, the company announced "We’re getting rid of a number of restrictions on topics like immigration, gender identity".

== Role in conflicts ==
The company has been alleged to have exacerbated conflict including the Rohingya genocide and Tigray genocide.

== See also ==
- Criticism of Amazon – Varied criticism across business areas
- Criticism of Apple
- Criticism of Google
- Criticism of Microsoft
- Criticism of Yahoo!
- Europe v Facebook – Austrian author and privacy activist
- Facebook Files – Internal document leak
- Facebook history
- Facebook malware – Malware incidents and responses on Facebook
- Facebook Pixel – Method to track the viewing of a webpage
- Instagram's impact on people – Social media platform owned by Meta
- Issues involving social networking services – Online platform used to build relations
- Online hate speech – Type of hate speech
- Social media and suicide
- Surveillance capitalism – Concept in political economics
- Techlash – Economic and social activity facilitated by technological platforms
