= Celeb Jihad =

Pornographic website

- Website type: Pornography, celebrity gossip, satire, leaks
- Available in: English, Spanish, Japanese, Italian, Korean, Bulgarian, Russian, Turkish, German, Chinese, Greek
- Headquarters: Los Angeles, California, U.S.
- Revenue: Advertisements
- Website: www.celebjihad.com
- Registration: none
- Launched: 18 March 2008; 18 years ago
- Current status: Online

Celeb Jihad is a website known for sharing naked (often sexual) videos and photos as well as faked ones of celebrities from their movies and paparazzi photos as a form of jihad satire. The Daily Beast describes it as a "satirical celebrity gossip website".

The website describes itself as "a satirical website containing published rumors, speculation, assumptions, opinions, fiction as well as factual information". The site lists its owner as "Durka Durka Mohammad", a fictitious terrorist whose goal is "destroying the poisonous celebrity culture" of America.

The website has participated in a series of releases of images and video, generally believed to have been stolen from hacked cell-phones, dubbed "Fappening 2.0".

In August 2017 it released nude pictures of Lindsey Vonn, Tiger Woods, Miley Cyrus, Kristen Stewart, and Katharine McPhee and Sydney Sweeny. The image of Woods and Vonn, posted August 21, was suppressed in apparent reaction to legal threats on August 23; images of Carly Booth were deleted August 23 or 24.

In November 2017 Celeb Jihad released naked images of WWE wrestlers Saraya Bevis, JoJo Offerman, and Maria Kanellis, the latest in a long series of similar leaks of WWE celebrity images. The website has also released fake nude photos and videos of celebrities, including doctored photos and videos of Meghan Markle, Taylor Swift, Ariana Grande, Selena Gomez, Megan Fox, and Kate Upton. In January 2024, Taylor Swift stated that she would be considering legal action against the owners of the website after AI-generated photos and videos of her performing sexual acts while wearing attire related to the Kansas City Chiefs were posted on the site as well as other social media platforms such as X.

== See also ==
- Celebrity sex tape
- Imagery of nude celebrities
- iCloud leaks of celebrity photos
