= FBP =

FBP may refer to:

- Fábrica de Braço de Prata, a defunct Portuguese weapons manufacturer
  - FBP submachine gun
- FBP: Federal Bureau of Physics, an American comic book series
- Federal Bureau of Prisons
- Film and Publication Board, is a content-classification and censorship authority in South Africa
- Filtered back projection, an analytic tomographic image reconstruction algorithm
- First BanCorp, a Puerto Rican financial holding company
- Fixed book price agreement
- Flow-based programming
- Fluff Busting Purity, a web browser extension
- Folate-binding protein
- Fructose 1,6-bisphosphate
- Fructose 1,6-bisphosphatase
- Funds for Endangered Parrots (German: Fonds für bedrohte Papageien, FbP), a German conservation organization
- Progressive Citizens' Party (German: Fortschrittliche Bürgerpartei), a political party in Liechtenstein
- FBP candidatus, bacterial phylum Abditibacteriota
