= Sanghani =

Clan of Koli caste of Gujarat

Sanghani Koli संघाणी कोली
- Clan (Gotra) of Koli caste
- Ethnicity: Koli people
- Location: Gujarat; Daman and Diu
- Varna: Warrior
- Parent tribe: Gujarati Koli
- Language: Koli; Gujarati; Hindi; English
- Religion: Hindu
- Surnames: Thakor; Patel

The Sanghani is a clan of Koli caste found in the Indian state of Gujarat. Sanghani Kolis got their name from a village called as Kotra Sanghani of Rajkot district in Saurashtra region of Gujarat state.

A few Sanghani Koli families are settled in the United States, Canada, United Kingdom, United Arab Emirates, and Kenya.

== Notable ==
Notable individuals with this surname include:

- Dileepbhai Sanghani, Indian politician
- Radhika Sanghani, British writer and author of Virgin and Not That Easy
- Shaun Sanghani, American film producer and writer
