= Edison Chen photo scandal =

2008 show business scandal in Hong Kong

The affair dominated the front covers of gossip magazines in early February 2008.

The Edison Chen photo scandal was a 2008 Hong Kong showbiz scandal that involved unlawful online distribution of stolen private intimate photographs of Canadian-born actor Edison Chen with various high-profile women of the Hong Kong film, television and fashion industry, among them actresses Gillian Chung, Bobo Chan, Rachel Ngan, and Cecilia Cheung. The scandal shook the Hong Kong entertainment industry and received high-profile media attention locally and around the world, as some of the women involved were married at the time or upholding a public image of chaste bachelorettes, and some are daughters from prominent tycoon families. Many local newspapers headlined the story consecutively during the first fortnight of February 2008, relegating coverage of the 2008 Chinese winter storms to secondary prominence during Lunar New Year.

In a crackdown that itself became a controversial item, the Hong Kong police enlisted the assistance of Interpol to stem the spread of the photographs. Ten people were arrested in connection with the distribution of the photographs. A computer technician was convicted of three counts of obtaining access to a computer with dishonest intent, and received a custodial sentence of eight and a half months.

The police crackdown raised questions over violations of the privacy and free speech rights of Internet users. The manner in which actors, their management, and the police handled the situation, in turn, made those arrested into heroes for some Internet users.

Chen admitted being the author and copyright owner of most of the photographs, and stated that the private photographs had been stolen and published illegally without his consent. He made a public apology, especially to the women involved, and also announced that he would "step away indefinitely" from the Hong Kong entertainment industry.

== History ==
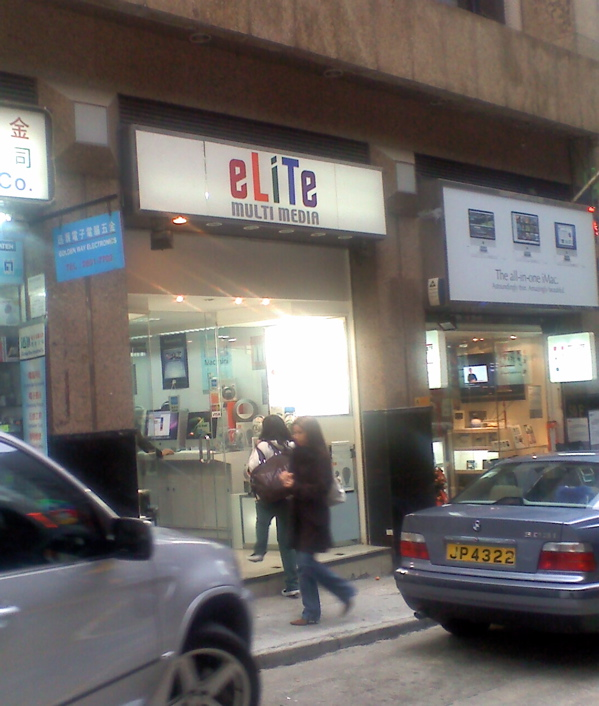
Elite Multimedia, the shop at the centre of the allegations

In November 2006, Chen purchased a pink PowerBook laptop computer, a photograph of which he published on his blog. It may have come from Elite Multimedia, a computer shop in Hong Kong's Central District. According to the police, when Chen brought his computer to the shop for repairs in 2007, employees may have discovered over 1,300 intimate nude photographs of Chen and numerous female celebrities in the computer's hard drive and secretly made copies of these files. According to Chen, the image files were deleted before the computer was taken in for repairs.

Chen's photographs were reportedly made sometime between 2003 and 2006. One close friend indicated that Chen liked to take photographs during intimate moments with his sexual partners, of whom 14 were celebrities, and privately showed these to a select group of close friends.

=== Unfolding ===
The first intimate photograph, with likenesses of Chen and Gillian Chung, was posted on the Hong Kong Discuss Forum at approximately 8:30 p.m. on 27 January 2008. Although the original post was deleted after a few hours, the image did the rounds at other major forums in Hong Kong such as Uwants and HKGolden. Chung's management agency, Emperor Entertainment Group (EEG), immediately challenged its authenticity, and filed a police report. The following day, a second explicit photograph of Chen with another starlet appeared on the Internet. EEG denounced the person who released it. Gillian Chung had taken a leave of absence, and would not comment on the matter. Shaped by the denials, the initial media consensus was that the photographs were hoaxes. Nevertheless, the story became the headline of major local Hong Kong newspapers.

Over a few hours on 29 January, several more photographs appeared on the Internet. On one, journals identified Cecilia Cheung from her distinctive tattoo set. The photographs became the talk of the town, and local discussion forums became saturated. Journals established with known video footage that the photographs were taken inside Chen's residence. Nevertheless, Cheung's solicitors denounced the upload as a "malicious, immoral and irresponsible act".

Assistant Commissioner of Police (Crime) Vincent Wong Fook-chuen said that 19 officers from the Commercial Crime Bureau were investigating. The police and photographic experts authenticated the photos involving the first three female celebrities. Police requested Internet service providers to stamp out all local traces of the as yet unclassified "offensive material". Related discussion threads were progressively deleted. The police retrieved the IP addresses of more than 30 Internet users who allegedly posted photographs.

At this time I am not able to discuss matters related to the case, but I do feel it is my obligation to accept full responsibility and take action to help both the victims and those associated with them to heal their wounds.
In this regard, I plead with everyone to please stop forwarding the images on the Internet. Furthermore, to completely rid the images from your computer...

— Edison Chen, as posted to his blog

After the exposure of the eighth photograph, Chen quietly left Hong Kong and flew to Boston. On 4 February, Chen released a 90-second video clip in English in which he took responsibility and apologised to those who may have been affected by the posting of photographs.

On 6 February, a forum user leaked hundreds more photographs in defiance of the police. The uploader, dubbed by the public as "Kira", promised to release a 32-minute video the next day. Two days later, three pictures of a young woman showering appeared on the Internet. The subject was rapidly identified as 18-year-old Vincy Yeung, Chen's girlfriend and niece of Albert Yeung, chairman of EEG. The police confirmed these three images were among the 1,300 photographs known to them. Having said there were only six participants, the police explained the appearance of a seventh, saying that her photographs had been erroneously grouped with one of the other females.

Gillian Chung was the first starlet to make a public appearance. After a New Year celebration with fans on 11 February, she delivered a brief statement to the press in which she apologised for the hurt caused to those around her. Emperor sought closure by stating that neither it nor any of its artists would be making any further statement about the incident. The press conference drew mixed response from the media and the public. An Apple Daily commentary was particularly scathing about the hypocrisy of Chung and of her management company for only obliquely hinting at her "licentiousness". On 14 February, two new nude photographs surfaced – one featuring an unidentified woman fellating Chen, and another showed a woman lying on a bed.

...society as a whole has been affected by this. In this regard, I am deeply saddened. I would like now to apologize to all the people for all the suffering that has been caused and the problems that have arisen from this. I would like to apologize to all the ladies and to all their families for any harm or hurt that they have been feeling...Most importantly, I would like to say sorry to all the people of Hong Kong.

— Edison Chen, press conference 21 February 2008

Chen returned to Hong Kong on 21 February, and immediately held a press conference asking for forgiveness and announcing his indefinite departure from the Hong Kong entertainment industry. Chen confirmed that the photographs belonged to him and were private, and stated that they were obtained without his consent and then made public. His lawyer emphasised that reproduction whether in whole or in part would constitute copyright infringement.

Chen was questioned by police for several days consecutively, and Sing Tao Daily revealed that a cache of computer disks and other storage devices containing in excess of 10,000 images were found in Chen's residence. Media reported that five "new" celebrities had been identified by police, who gave only cryptic descriptions. Investigations were said to have been hampered by Chen's caution, and by the lack of co-operation of the "new" female victims: some had left town, and one had already publicly denied her involvement. Chen denied that he had been blackmailed.

Over the course of the two-week period, a total of over a hundred images each of Gillian Chung, Bobo Chan, Candice Chan, and Cecilia Cheung fellating him were exposed, as well as Chen performing cunnilingus to Chung; there were also approximately another hundred nude photos featuring various others, namely Mandy Chen, Rachel Ngan, Maggie Q and Vincy Yeung, who was photographed while taking a bath.

== Police actions ==
=== Hong Kong ===
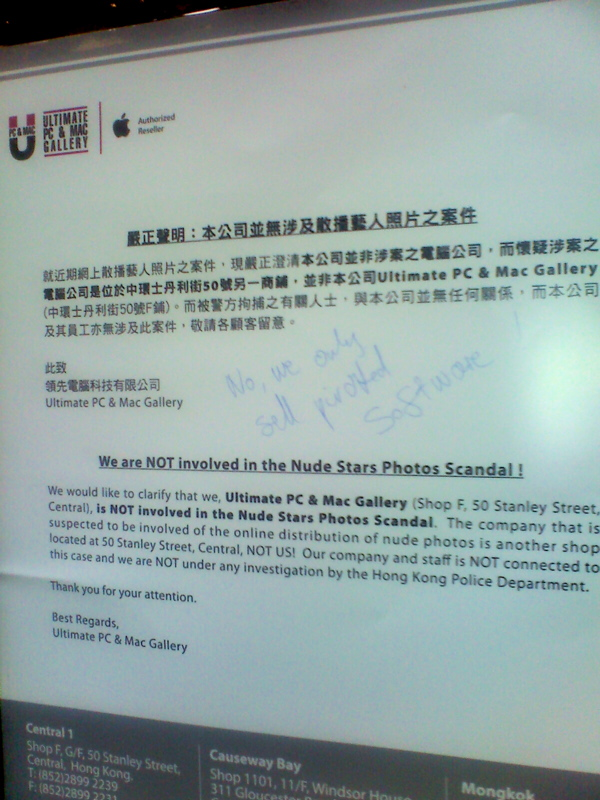
Declaration of non-involvement posted outside the Apple-authorised computer store next to Elite Multimedia

On 31 January 2008, an unemployed man identified as 29-year-old Chung Yik-tin (鍾亦天) was arrested for allegedly uploading one image; 12 pictures were found on his computer. The next day he was arraigned but denied bail because he was suspected of blackmailing the actor and actresses. Chung Yik-tin spent Chinese New Year in detention. After investigating the connection between the suspect and artists, the police were satisfied that blackmail was not involved. Chung was unconditionally released from detention on 15 February, and charges against him were dropped.

On 2 February, police arrested four men and two women in connection with the distribution of the photographs. Of the six, three men and a woman were released on HK$20,000 (US$2,560) bail and ordered to report back to the police in eight weeks. On 4 February, a 29-year-old man became the eighth person to be detained in connection with the disseminating of nude photos; 23-year-old Sze Ho-Chun (史可雋) was also arrested. He was charged with "dishonest use of computers with criminal intent", which has a maximum penalty of five years imprisonment. Sze appeared in Eastern Court on 5 February, where he denied the charge and was released on HK$50,000 bail. The case was adjourned to 22 February.

Assistant Commissioner Wong said the source of the pictures had been traced, but he would not confirm reports stating that they had been taken from Chen's computer. He added that the authenticity of the photographs was no longer in question. Wong also said of the six women found in the photographs, four were local celebrities and two were unknown to the police. None of the women were named. Wong was certain that no overseas artists were involved. He said that whilst it was not a crime to transfer the pictures to friends, those who had posted the images to Internet web pages could be in breach of the law. On 5 February, as another of the suspects was released on HK$50,000 bail, six more related photographs surfaced on the Internet. In the early hours on Chinese New Year's Eve, several hundred more photographs appeared on the Internet; there were two new faces.

Arrest number ten occurred on 10 February. Kwok Chun-wai, a 24-year-old logistics clerk, had allegedly posted the link to a local discussion forum after uploading a compressed file containing over a hundred images to a site in Cyprus. Kwok was released on HK$10,000 bail. He pleaded guilty to three counts of publishing an obscene article. On 24 July 2008, he was sentenced to two months in prison, suspended for two years.

=== Mainland China ===
Web sites on the mainland are usually more sensitive to political issues than to pornography, and for several weeks major sites such as Baidu permitted the images to be disseminated. During this time, photographs were also posted on the popular mainland China chat room, Tianya Club, and had been viewed nearly 20 million times a day. Around 20 February however, mainland sites took action to prevent access to the photos.

A crackdown began in neighbouring Guangdong province on the manufacturing, selling and spreading the CD-ROMs of the celebrity photos, which sold "like hotcakes" in Shenzhen. Police arrested 10 people suspected of the production in Shenzhen. Police in Beijing announced on 21 February that it would act to stop the circulation of the photographs. Officials declared that showing the photos to friends or posting them on blogs or online forums, even without profit motive, could be punishable by detention for up to 15 days; transmission of more than 200 of the photos as a package on the internet would be met with criminal prosecution.

=== Taiwan ===
A Taiwanese man aged 24, Huang Wei-lun, was arrested in Taipei County on suspicion of posting the explicit photos and videos in his blog and instructing net surfers how to download the images. Police in Kaohsiung warned of the two-year penalty for selling pornographic CDs, and raided shops and arcades where discs of Edison Chen's photographs have been selling slowly, for NT$100. One observer remarked that young people did not buy discs as they can get the photographs easily from the internet.

== Legal issues ==
=== Freedom of speech ===
On 2 February, Commissioner of Police Tang King Shing warned that anyone with the pictures on their computer could be in breach of the law, even if there was no record of distribution. This led to an immediate objection by lawmaker "Long Hair" Leung Kwok-hung, who led a protest of about two dozen people outside police headquarters in Wan Chai. They accused the police of sowing confusion and creating an atmosphere of "White Terror" among netizens. Leung urged Commissioner Tang to clarify whether merely keeping the pictures violated the law. Some opinions disagree on distributing the photos.

=== Selective application of the law ===
The denial of bail for Chung Yik-tin sparked controversy over the subjective application of the law. Legislator Ronny Tong accused the police of humiliating a suspect by their excessively hasty actions. The police's selectiveness in this case, as compared with previous cases of pornography distribution on the Internet, was also the focus of public attention. The local Chairman of the Internet Society and legislator Regina Ip said that it was inevitable that police would apply the law selectively, for it would be impractical to take action against every person who had committed an offence in Hong Kong.

Commentary in the newspaper Ming Pao also remarked on the widespread outrage about the perceived selective application of legal principles – that a person charged with an apparently minor offence being denied bail whilst two others, unnamed, with allegedly heavier involvement in the spread of the photographs were allowed out on bail. A commentary in Apple Daily decried the "clear intimidation of netizens" by the police, and for arresting people without bringing the alleged main source and victim (Chen) for interrogation.

=== Definition of "obscenity" ===
While publishing an "obscene" (淫褻) article carries a maximum sentence of 3 years, an "indecent" (不雅) article only carries a maximum sentence of 12 months. Ming Pao revealed on 14 February that it had received interim classification from the Obscene Articles Tribunal (OAT) relating to five photographs it had submitted for opinion. Three of these photographs were classified as "indecent" while two were considered "obscene". The only photograph which was in circulation on 27 January, allegedly posted by Chung Yik-tin, was "indecent". Thus, the journal raised the question that Chung may have been charged with a wrong offence. Also, the law applies only after OAT's classification. Since the police arrested and charged Chung before classification, some viewed the arrest as unlawful. An assistant professor at the University of Hong Kong questioned whether an amended charge of "Publishing an Indecent Article" applied to photographs uploaded onto the Internet.

== Hearing and trial ==
=== Chen's hearing ===
Although Chen agreed to co-operate with the authorities, he refused to return to Hong Kong to give evidence in the trial. A team of four lawyers and a magistrate were thus flown out to Vancouver, British Columbia, Canada for a hearing beginning on 23 February 2009 at taxpayers' expense. Legislator Ronny Tong questioned the "extravagancy" of this hearing, and suggested there may be an easier and cheaper way to collect Chen's evidence.

During the hearing, which was presided over by Supreme Court of British Columbia Justice Elaine Adair, with Hong Kong's Chief Magistrate Tong Man (唐文) as co-commissioner, Chen confirmed that Cecilia Cheung, Gillian Chung, Bobo Chan and Rachel Ngan were indeed involved. He testified that the photographs, taken from 2001 to 2006, were consensual, and were only shown to the women involved. He professed his "huge shock" at seeing the images on the Internet, citing that he had deleted the images before sending his computer in for repairs in summer of 2006.

=== Sentence ===
Computer technician Sze Ho-chun was convicted on 13 May 2009 of three counts of obtaining access to a computer with dishonest intent, and received a custodial sentence of eight and a half months. However, there was no evidence that he uploaded the pictures to the Internet.

== Impact and consequences ==
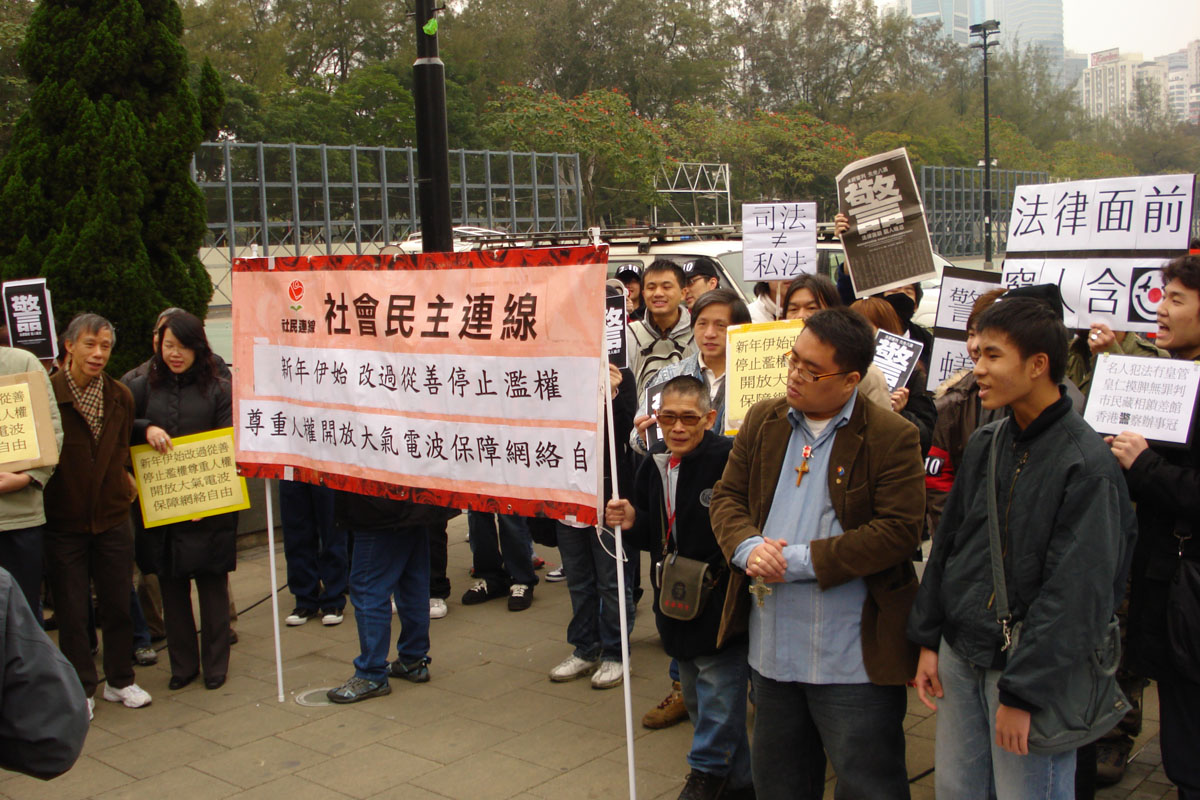
The initial group of protesters at Victoria Park, 10 February

=== Police ===
On 3 February, a small group led by Leung Kwok-hung protested the abuse of power by the police. One week later, there was a larger protest demonstrated against alleged "discriminatory" law enforcement against Internet users. The involvement of local celebrities led to complaints that the wave of arrests were indicative of a legal double standard: protesters claimed that the police failed to investigate other cases of nude photos being published without their subject's permission. Approximately 300 people marched on police headquarters in Wan Chai. They petitioned the police to apologise publicly, to release Chung Yik-tin, to stop "an abuse of power", and also demanded the resignation of Commissioner Tang. In the wake of the scandal, some citizens also became more concerned about the integrity of the law and some citizens felt that some were more equal than others in Hong Kong.

The police were widely criticised for their handling of the case: in a survey by the South China Morning Post, some 48 percent of respondents believed the police had created unnecessary fear among the Internet community, and a similar percentage were dissatisfied with the police handling of the case. However, Assistant Commissioner Wong insisted that they had "not departed from normal practices" and had "acted correctly under the laws".

=== Edison Chen ===
As a consequence of the scandal, Chen was pulled from the upcoming Stephen Fung film Jump; credit card company Manhattan Titanium withdrew all advertisements featuring Chen, and Chen's appearance in The Dark Knight was downgraded to a cameo. The Los Angeles Times reported that Pepsi China, Standard Chartered Bank, Samsung, Levi's and the Hong Kong MTR, had dropped Chen or declined to renew ad campaigns involving him.

A hundred police officers were present throughout Chen's press conference on 21 February, and some citizens complained about the waste of manpower. The police emphasised the importance of maintaining public order in light of the great public and media interest in the case. The triads reportedly offered a HK$500,000 reward to anybody who hacked off Chen's hand. This contributed to fears for Chen's safety upon his return, and heavy police protection.

On 12 March 2009, after Chen had appeared at a publicity event in Singapore, a threatening letter said to have originated in the US containing a bullet was delivered to a Cable TV station mailbox. Secretary for Security Ambrose Lee said violence or intimidation would not be tolerated.

=== Gillian Chung ===
Emperor declared that Gillian Chung was on sick leave following the incident, Hong Kong Disneyland Resort dropped the use of a Twins music video for the celebration of the Chinese New Year because of Chung's involvement in the controversy. Preparations for the Twins concerts in Hong Kong, originally scheduled for 12–16 April, were postponed.

Chung's appearance at a charity programme on 17 February met with around 2,100 complaints to the Broadcasting Authority, 373 to TVB, and 202 to the Television and Entertainment Licensing Authority (TELA). The Broadcasting Authority passed all the correspondence received to TVB.

On 26 February 2008, the South China Morning Post, citing the Dalian Evening News, reported that Chung and Nicholas Tse (husband of Cecilia Cheung) had been dropped from the Beijing Olympics opening ceremony by artistic director Zhang Yimou. Tse did appear at the closing ceremony, sharing the stage with Jackie Chan, Emil Chau, Andy Lau, and others. Twins "temporarily" dissolved in late June 2008, four months after Gillian was caught up in the scandal.

She recused herself from public for more than a year following the incident and later apologised for hurting the people around her. During the hiatus, she took classes in many areas which she hoped would serve her professionally. During the course of her disappearance from public view, fellow Twins member Charlene Choi twice publicly denied rumours of suicide attempts by Chung. Chung revealed she decided that suicide would not have solved any problems; she said her mother was supportive of her quitting the industry.

Interviewed in an episode of TVB's Be My Guest in March 2009, Chung admitted she loved Chen, and let him take photos of them engaging in sex because she feared to lose him. It was reported that Chung, under contract with Emperor Entertainment Group in 2008, did not receive any salary for the duration of the scandal, and even struggled to pay rent.

=== Cecilia Cheung's reaction ===
Cecilia Cheung being interviewed by Au Wing-Kyun (區永權)

After Chen's statement to court, Cheung broke silence in the matter on a televised interview on iCable on 27 February. She heavily criticised Chen for shedding crocodile tears, saying that he had not returned calls and had switched off his telephone when the incident came to light. She accused him of hypocrisy in a bid to win the public's forgiveness while hurting others caught up in the scandal. She denied rumours of a rift with her then-husband Nicolas Tse and in-laws.

=== Other female stars who have worked with Chen ===
Taiwanese pop stars Jolin Tsai and Elva Hsiao, who have collaborated with Chen on various projects, fearing damage to their reputations from rumours, both issued statements through their agents that they had "never been involved with Chen". They each issued "rewards" of NT$100,000,000 ($3.3 million) defying anyone to come forward with legally authenticated photographs.

=== Media ===
The scandal shocked the general public and ignited debate about sexual morality. The blanket coverage of the local press, their reporting style, and the appearance of photographs has also been met with public complaints to TELA. TELA suspected that at least two journals violated the Obscene Articles Ordinance, and sent copies of issue No. 936 of Next Magazine and issue No. 531 of the Oriental Sunday magazine to the OAT for classification. The Tribunal returned an interim classification of "Class I", meaning the magazines were "neither obscene nor indecent", and TELA demanded a full public hearing to review its decision. The OAT, the method of selecting its adjudicators, and the Obscene Articles Ordinance, came under fire. It reportedly classified Michelangelo's David as "indecent" by adhering rigidly to a definition.

The images reached China mostly through an image-sharing service on Baidu (Tieba). Beijing Network News Council (BNNC) held a meeting on 18 February to discuss the "romantic pictures", and criticised Baidu for spreading the pictures. Other web sites that actively discouraged the photo distribution, namely Sohu, Sina and Netease, were praised by BNNC.

== See also ==
- Imagery of nude celebrities
- 2002 East Week magazine kidnap incident
- 2003 Jade Solid Gold Top 10 award bribing
- 2014 celebrity nude photo leak
- Justin Lee sex scandal
