= Imagery of nude celebrities =

Topic of visual depiction of nude celebrities

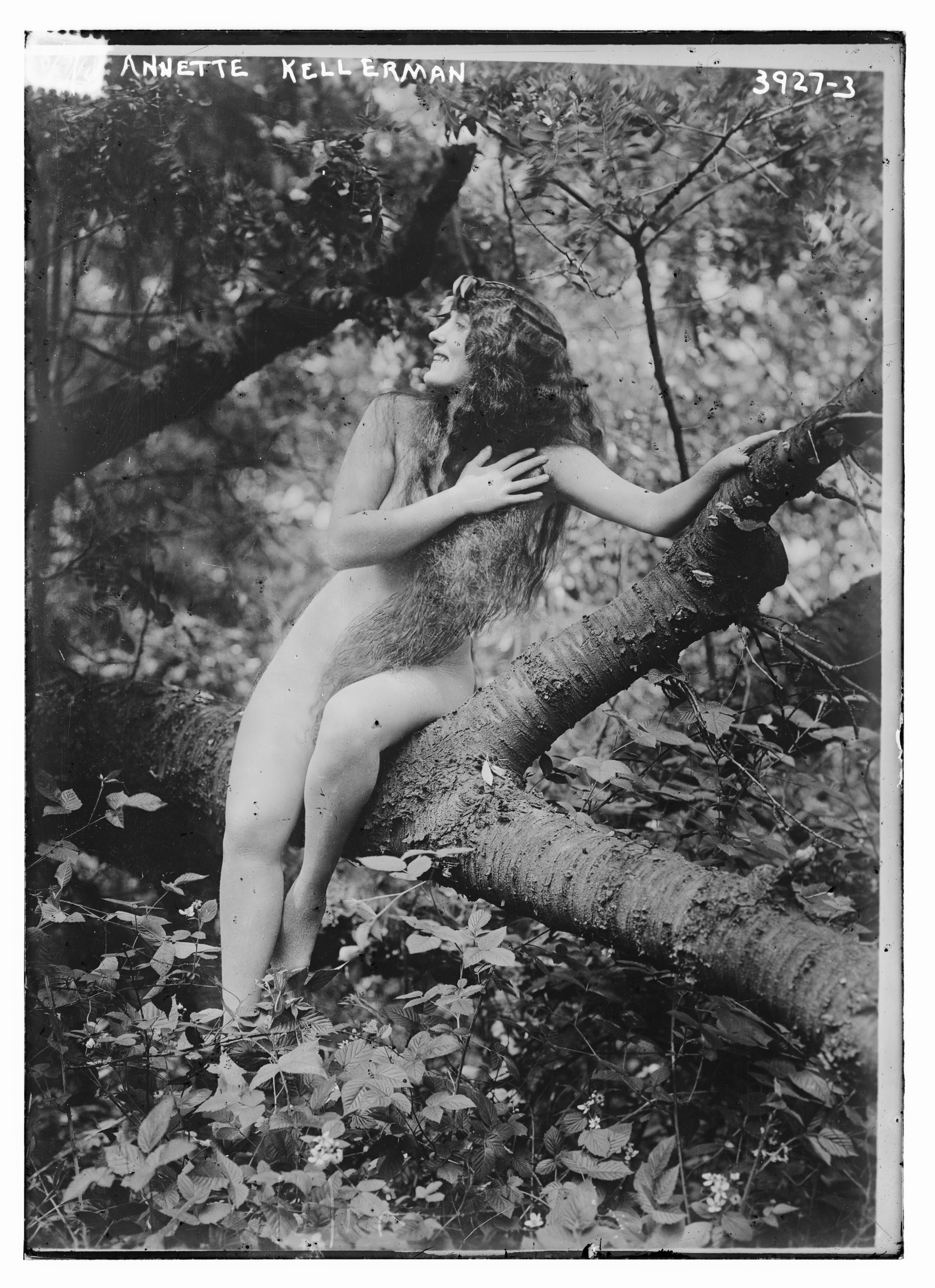
Annette Kellerman in nude scene from A Daughter of the Gods (1915)

There has been demand for imagery of nude celebrities for many decades. It is a lucrative business exploited by websites and magazines.

Types include authorized images, such as film screenshots, copies from previously published images, such as shots from magazines or stills or clips from movies, to unauthorised images such as celebrity sex tapes and paparazzi photos capturing unintentional or private scenes, and faked or doctored images.

There has been a commercial demand for images of nude celebrities for many decades. Playboy magazine was known for offering celebrities large amounts of money to appear nude in its magazine, and more downmarket pornographic magazines search far and wide for nude pictures of celebrities taken unaware – for example, when they are bathing topless or nude at what the subject thought was a secluded beach, or taken before the individual was well known. Paparazzi-produced photos are in high demand among sensational magazines and press.

In some countries, privacy law and personality rights can lead to civil action against organizations that publish photos of nude celebrities without a model release, and this restricts the availability of such photos through the print media. On the internet, the difficulty of identifying offenders and applying court sanction makes circulation of such photographs much less risky. Such photographs circulate through online photo distribution channels such as usenet and internet forums, and commercial operators, often in countries beyond the reach of courts, also offer such photos for commercial gain. Copyright restrictions are often ignored.

In some cases, when the depicted person is young and the photo is an actual photo, nude media of celebrities may fall under the purview of child pornography laws, a legal regime with harsh penalties for distribution. When such photos are faked or doctored, the media is classified as simulated child pornography.

== History ==
There has likely been interest in nude images of celebrities for as long as artistic nude imagery and pornography have existed. One of the more famous examples is Playboy's inaugural December 1953 issue, which featured photos of Marilyn Monroe from a 1949 photo session as its first Playmate of the Month. The commercialization, promotion, and organized supply of nude celebrity images can be traced to another men's magazine, High Society, and the efforts of its first female Editor, Gloria Leonard. This began as a feature that showcased risqué photos of celebrities like Jodie Foster and Goldie Hawn, usually lifted from film stills, and in 1986 became a spin-off venture of High Society called Celebrity Skin magazine. Over its 25-year run, Margot Kidder, Ann-Margret and Barbra Streisand tried unsuccessfully to sue the magazine for publishing nude photos of them. Yet another magazine, Penthouse, earned notoriety for its publication of nude photographs of models who at the time were not celebrities, some of whom later attained fame. Penthouse published nude photos in its September 1984 issue of a young adult film actress, Traci Lords (later found to be underage at the time), and Vanessa Williams, then-Miss America; the ensuing scandal caused Williams to be stripped of her crown.

== Types of nude celebrity media ==
Nude celebrity media falls into six main categories:

- Film screenshots: Many actors and actresses have done nude or partially nude scenes in non-pornographic mainstream films. Screenshots from these films are circulated widely and can usually be recognized by the low picture quality (from video). Increased popularity of broadband internet access makes possible the distribution of actual video clips and higher quality images, usually copied from DVDs. Often screenshots of these scenes are displayed in several frames as tiles.
- Paparazzi photographs: Occasionally, celebrities are photographed in revealing real-life situations. The most common scenario is a woman sunbathing topless, usually on a beach, yacht or by a pool. The photos are usually taken from a distance and rarely reveal more than breasts, although some celebrities have been photographed fully nude. Other types of paparazzi images of nude celebrities include 'nipple slips', in which low cut dresses, lack of a bra, an accidental fall of clothing or camera flash glares may reveal a celebrity's nipples. A final form is the increasingly frequent occurrence of an "upskirt" shot of female. Most such images show underwear, but some situations (such as celebrities exiting cars) have resulted in snapshots which are claimed to show genitalia.
- Nude photo shoots: Mainstream sex magazines such as Playboy or photographic art magazines such as Black+White routinely feature nude shoots of celebrities. Some celebrities have modeled for nude photographs prior to becoming famous. Such images are often later redistributed in digital form by the publisher, or by a third party.
- Stolen private materials: Private sexual photographs of celebrities are sometimes leaked online. This usually occurs after a hack on their cell phone or e-mail.
- Photos or videos released online by recipients: They are also sometimes released online by a former lover/spouse. Videos of celebrities performing sexual acts are also often leaked and are known as celebrity sex tapes.
- Fake or doctored photos: Many images found on the Internet and in yellow journalism are examples of fake nude photography, made using various image editing techniques. These typically combine the most recognizable features of a celebrity, such as their face, with the nude body of a suitable lesser-known pornographic actor. Unlike other forms of nude media of celebrities, faked photos can be produced with little effort or resources and do not require access to the celebrity, making them a popular option for amateurs. Another form of doctoring celebrity photos is known as "Celebrity X-Ray". This technique involves the use of digital image editing software to modify photos of celebrities dressed in skimpy, sheer or see-through material, in order to reveal what is hidden or obscured beneath the cloth. Another more recent technique is the use of deepfake software, which can insert a celebrity face into an entire video with the help of machine learning technology, and can be used to create deepfake pornography.

== Notable incidents or image leaks ==
- Wardrobe malfunction
- News International phone hacking scandal
- Edison Chen photo scandal
- iCloud leaks of celebrity photos (2014 celebrity nude photo leak)
- Erin Andrews § Stalking incident

== See also ==
- Mr. Skin
- Celebrity sex tape
- Deepfake
- Tijuana bible
- G Magazine
- Celebrity Skin
- Oui § Post–Playboy years
- Playgirl § Celebrity nudes
- Revista H
- Rule 34
- Spy
