= Willow Village =

Neighborhood in Menlo Park, California

Willow Village was a proposed neighborhood in Menlo Park, California adjacent to the Meta campus. The entire area is owned by Facebook, which sought to develop it. The neighborhood is proposed to have 1.75 million square feet of office space, 1,500 apartments, 125,000-square feet of retail, a 200-room hotel, a visitor center, and 5,319 parking spaces.

After years of delay, Meta announced on May 1, 2026 it was halting the project due to economic uncertainty and increased AI spending.
