= Nik Cubrilovic =

Self-confessed hacker

- Known for: Computer hacking

Nik Cubrilovic is an Australian former hacker and leading internet security blogger.

== Personal life ==
Nik Cubrilovic (Serbian: Čubrilović) is an ethnic Serb.

== Work ==
In 2011 he successfully forced Facebook to address a privacy flaw whereby the site would continue to track your web surfing habits even when logged out.

In May 2014 he published research into the weakness of the Australian government's my.gov.au websites illustrating a number of flaws allowing user impersonation, issues that were finally fixed in January 2015.

In September 2014 he provided analysis into the various security vectors such as phishing, searching of public social media sites and weaknesses in Apple's iCloud software which may have been used in the 2014 celebrity photo hack going on to consult for a number of other publications on the matter.

In November 2014 his analysis of hidden services seized in Operation Onymous cast doubt on the official figures from law enforcement about the effectiveness of the operation, claiming a 276 services not 400 were seized, and that 153 of those were scam or clone sites.

He has provided various coverage and commentary on Tor and the Dark Web on matters such as the Silk Road trial.

In January 2018 he was arrested for alleged hacking GoGet, a car sharing company.
