= Openbook (website) =

Openbook was a Facebook-specific search engine, built upon Facebook's publicly available API, which enabled one to search for specific texts on the walls of Facebook subscribers en masse which they had denoted, knowingly or unknowingly, as being available to "Everyone," i.e. to the Internet at large. Both an avowed parody of Facebook and an Internet privacy advocacy website, it was built by San Francisco website developers Will Moffat, Peter Burns and James Home within a few hours on May 12, 2010, and received nearly six million page views in its first two weeks on-line from over a million people in over two hundred countries. The website received extensive media attention from, among others, the Wall Street Journal, NPR and ABC News, including international coverage.

In May 2012, the website was moved from its original domain youropenbook.org to openbook.org. In July 2012, Openbook was shut down for legal reasons, and openbook.org has reverted to a foreign exchange website.

Facebook itself later added the same capacity to search Facebook pages for a word or phrase for logged-in users, but pulled it in January 2013 and later replaced it in December 2014 with a more limited functionality that only allows users to search their own posts, posts by people they follow, or posts which have been shared with them. However, as of 2026, while some limited functionality remains, posts that are published as "public" can be seen, and using keywords or sentences can pull public posts from random Facebook users.
