= Funds for Endangered Parrots =

German non-governmental organisation

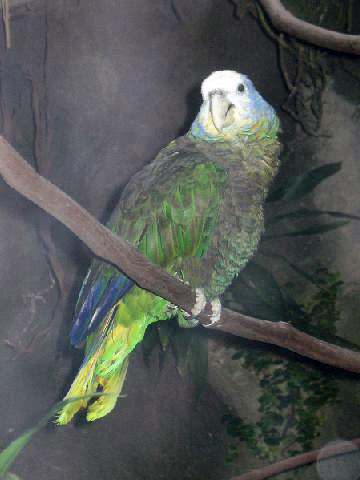
St. Vincent amazon

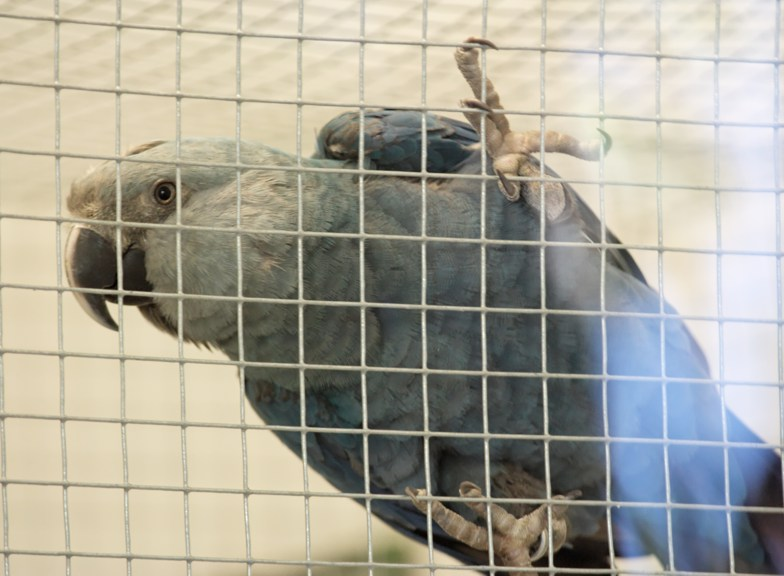
Spix's macaw

The Funds for Endangered Parrots (FbP) (German: Fonds für bedrohte Papageien) is a German non-governmental organisation (NGO) in the field of species conservation, which supports and operates projects worldwide for endangered parrot species.

== History ==
A working group for parrots was established in 1989 within the German Zoological Society for the Conservation of Species and Populations (German: Zoologische Gesellschaft für Arten-und Populationsschutz e. V. (ZGAP), which itself was founded in 1982. This working group was the first organisation worldwide to highlight the parlous situation of the Spix's macaw, which has now become extinct in the wild. Funds for Endangered Parrots was formed from the working group in October 1991.

The Funds does not only decide on the promoting of projects - for the most part on its own initiative. More than 475.000 euros in today's currency was raised in the first twenty years.

Since 1996 the Funds has organized an annual open one-day convention in the autumn for members and all other interested parties.

== Species conservation and project promotion ==
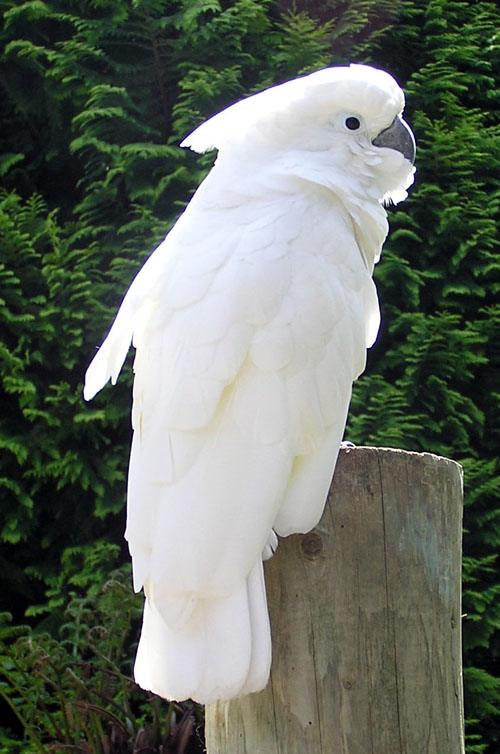
Umbrella cockatoo

Almost 50% of all parrot species are endangered and almost 25% of the species are critically endangered. The main reasons for this are persistent habitat destruction, such as land clearance with fire or settlement, on one hand and on the other the continuing trade in birds, which still offers wild-caught stock. Apart from these two main reasons there is a long list of others such as hunting and persecution as pests, the infiltration of other animal species into the habitat, changes to the habitat, the loss or reduction of breeding habitat and nesting trees and the lack of suitable food sources for the birds.

The Funds supports projects, which serves the conservation of parrots. Of great importance is close cooperation with conservation groups and the local people in the relevant region to ensure, through partnership and education, the long-term success of measures for the protection of the species concerned and their habitats.

The following are just two examples of the work of the Funds. With the conservation project for the Santa Marta conure in Colombia the Funds promotes a project of the Colombian foundation Alianza para Ecosístemas Críticos. The latter strives for close co-operation with the Indigenous people of the Sierra Nevada de Santa Marta. The endemic Santa Marta conure is a keystone species for education on the uniqueness of the flora and fauna of the mountain chain. The conservation project means that all involved work as equal partners in observation activities within the Indian reservation and in the determination of distribution patterns, the identification of breeding areas and migratory routes as well as the analysis of population and causes of decline. By optimizing cheese production among the small farmers in the distribution area of the conure through a dairy specialist working on behalf of the Funds and the establishment of a brand for this production the long-term security of the habitat structure of the conure is assured at the same time.

The causes for the endangered status of the citron-crested cockatoo on the Indonesian island of Sumba are somewhat different. The main causes are the loss of nesting availability and most of all capture for the trade, i.e. the black market. Apart from the creation of basic data on distribution, density and the importance of the various endangering factors, the surveillance and prevention of the trade is a main project task. The prosecution of poachers could be achieved for the first time. At the same time a strategy for creating awareness among the local people was developed, which includes, for example, visiting schools showing an educational film made by a Funds supporter. As many small schools do not have electricity, seeing such a film is a great event. The local partner here is BirdLife Indonesia.

Further examples of supported projects for parrot species:

- Asia: umbrella cockatoo, red-vented cockatoo, Palawan racket-tailed parrot, red and blue lory
- Americas: Lear's macaw, red-fronted macaw, yellow-eared parrot, St. Vincent amazon, rusty-faced parrot, lilacine amazon, great green macaw.
- Africa: black-cheeked lovebird

The Funds is represented in the International Union for Conservation of Nature and Natural Resources (IUCN) through the ZGAP. The Loro Parque Fundación and BirdLife International are international partner organisations of the Funds.

== Conventions ==
The one-day annual conventions, which have been held since 1996, bring together members and other interested parties. The day's agenda consists of presentations on a wide range of topics relevant to parrots such as conservation in the wild and the activities of the Funds as well as European Endangered Species Programme and breeding registers, Psittaculture, reports on the breeding and keeping of less endangered species, diet, veterinarian and biological advances, reports from the field and the latest developments in taxonomy. All the presentations are concluded by open discussion.

The conventions, which to date have been held in Germany, are usually attended by only 150 persons, so that there is a considerable dissemination effect among German parrot-keepers. The proceeds of the conventions are used for conservation projects. They are held either alongside a parrot and bird exhibition or at the premises of a zoo or bird park. The venue in 2000 was the bird show at Achern, in 2001 the DEU-BE-LUX bird show at Bitburg, in 2002 the bird show at Bielefeld-Senne, in 2003 the bird show at Coburg, in 2004 the Walsrode Bird Park, in 2005 the Ornithea bird show in the Porz suburb of Cologne, in 2006 the NiederRheinPark Plantaria at Kevelaer and in 2007 Leipzig Zoo. The convention in 2008 will be held at the Natural History Museum in Stuttgart and 2009 dem Vogelpark Walsrode.

== Composition and tasks ==
Funds for Endangered Parrots consists of parrot specialists dedicated to the protection of parrots in the wild. It functions formally as a working group, which chooses a committee for decision-making and project oversight for two-year periods The tasks of the Funds, i.e. the committee members, are the analysis and assessment of project applications, suggestions for projects, evaluation of work carried out on the projects as well as the preparation and organisation of the conventions. The committee at present consists of Thomas Arndt, Dr. Marcellus Bürkle, Detlev Franz, Hans-Jürgen Künne, Dr. Rainer Niemann, Dr. Matthias Reinschmidt, Klaus Sasse, Marion Wiegel and René Wüst (spokesperson for the Funds).

== Literature ==
- George Arc, Franz Robiller (Hrsg.): Das große Lexikon der Vogelpflege. Ulmer, Stuttgart 2003, ISBN 3-8001-4425-5
- Hans-Jürgen Künne: Der „Fonds für bedrohte Papageien“. In: Gefiederte Welt 121, 3/97, S. 95–97.
- Rene Wüst: 20 Jahre Artenschutz für Papageien. In: ZGAP Mitteilungen 2/2009, S.29
- Rene Wüst: Fonds für bedrohte Papageien: 20 Jahre Artenschutz für Papageien. In: Gefiederte Welt
