= Fluff Busting Purity =

Facebook-customizing web browser extension

- Developer: Steve Fernandez
- Release: 2009
- Stable release: 38.4.0 / 15 January 2026
- Written in: JavaScript, CSS
- Operating system: Cross-platform
- Type: Google Chrome extension Firefox extension Edge extension Opera extension Brave extension Maxthon extension Greasemonkey script
- Website: fbpurity.com

Fluff Busting Purity, or FB Purity for short (previously known as Facebook Purity) is a web browser extension designed to customize the Facebook website's user interface and add extra functionality. Developed by Steve Fernandez, a UK-based programmer, it was first released in 2009 as a Greasemonkey script, as donationware. It is available for Firefox, Google Chrome, Microsoft Edge, Safari, Opera, Brave and Maxthon.

In February 2012, Fernandez was banned from Facebook, although he was allowed back two weeks later. In April, Facebook blocked links to his site, with an error message saying the site was "spammy or abusive", a generic error message given for any site that they deem to have violated their terms and conditions for any reason. Facebook stopped blocking the link to the FB Purity website at some point in 2012, the exact date unknown.

In December 2012, the company both objected to the name "Facebook Purity" (which Fernandez changed to 'Fluff Busting Purity' in response), and claimed that its development violates the site's Terms of Service. In response to this perceived violation, the company told Fernandez he was unauthorized to access Facebook, which he described at the time as potentially the "end of the road" for the script's development. The add-on subsequently continued to receive releases, with the official F.B. Purity website listing version 38.4.0 as the latest release on 15 January 2026. Version releases have also been distributed through official browser-specific download pages of the FB Purity extension: (Firefox, Google Chrome, Microsoft Edge, Opera).

During the summer of 2020, Facebook informed users that a new user interface featuring light and dark views would become mandatory, with users temporarily being able to switch back to the Classic look. In response, F.B. Purity v30.6.5 was released, offering an option to retain the older look, however, that functionality stopped working and was removed when Facebook removed the old site code some months later.

There has been no release of FBP since January 2026, and Fernandez has not made any public statement as to whether he is continuing to develop FBP. Many Facebook features it previously blocked, such as intrusive ads, are no longer blocked.
