= Radhika Sanghani =

Writer and journalist

- Education: Haberdashers' Aske's School for Girls
- Occupations: Writer, journalist, author
- Writing career
- Language: English
- Genres: Journalism, fiction

Radhika Sanghani is a British writer and journalist who has contributed to publications including The Daily Telegraph. She is also the author of books such as Virgin: A Novel and Not That Easy.

== Education ==
Sanghani attended Haberdashers' Aske's School for Girls, an independent school in Elstree, England, and later pursued a degree in English at University College London. She then completed a Master of Arts in Newspaper Journalism at City University.

== Career ==
Sanghani's motivation to pursue a career in journalism was sparked by the example set by Sue Lloyd-Roberts, particularly her investigative work that shed light on the constraints faced by women worldwide. In 2012, she embarked on a role as a graduate trainee at The Daily Telegraph and remained with the publication for five years, serving as a features writer and columnist. As of September 2017 she works as a freelance writer. Sanghani specialises in gender issues, social affairs and lifestyle feature writing.

In 2015, Sanghani garnered attention by asserting that office air conditioning is sexist. Her assertion evoked a range of responses, spanning from negative reactions to outright ridicule.
