= Foundation for Individual Rights and Expression =

American free speech organization

- Abbreviation: FIRE
- Founded: 1999; 27 years ago
- Founder: Alan Charles Kors; Harvey Silverglate
- Tax ID no.: 04-3467254
- Headquarters: Philadelphia, Pennsylvania
- Coordinates: 39.9481°N 75.1513°W
- President: Greg Lukianoff
- Budget: $32m+ USD
- Website: fire.org

The Foundation for Individual Rights and Expression (FIRE), formerly called the Foundation for Individual Rights in Education, is a 501(c)(3) non-profit civil liberties group founded in 1999 with the mission of protecting freedom of speech on college campuses in the United States. FIRE changed its name in June 2022, when it broadened its focus from colleges to freedom of speech throughout American society. The New York Times describes FIRE as an "increasingly prominent free-speech organization".

FIRE is nonpartisan and has challenged Democratic and Republican politicians for threatening First Amendment rights. FIRE also rates academic institutions based on their free speech policies, adjudicates free speech controversies on college campuses, and educates the public in other ways. FIRE's president and CEO is attorney Greg Lukianoff, a regular commentator on First Amendment-related issues. The group has 120 employees, including a litigation department of about 20 lawyers.

== Overview ==
The Foundation for Individual Rights in Education was co-founded by Alan Charles Kors and Harvey Silverglate in 1999. They remained FIRE's co-directors until 2004. Kors and Silverglate had co-authored a 1998 book opposing censorship at colleges following the water buffalo incident at the University of Pennsylvania. Silverglate had served on the board of the American Civil Liberties Union (ACLU) of Massachusetts. Kors served as FIRE's first president and chairperson. Its first executive director and, later, CEO, was Thor Halvorssen.

FIRE files lawsuits against colleges and universities that it perceives as curtailing First Amendment rights of students and professors. FIRE has been described as a competitor of the ACLU. FIRE describes itself as having been founded to be non-ideological and nonpartisan. They are rated as having a center-right bias by Media Bias / Fact Check, for "selective criticism of progressive policies, and funding from primarily right-leaning foundations". According to a January 2025 article in New York magazine, a survey of FIRE email subscribers found 28 percent identify as left-leaning, 32 percent as right-leaning, and the rest as "other." In 2024, 60 percent of FIRE's casework involved people threatened by censorship attempts that came from their political right.

FIRE has received funding from groups which primarily support conservative and libertarian causes, including the Bradley Foundation, Sarah Scaife Foundation, and the Charles Koch Institute, although it receives donations from across the ideological spectrum. Among its other donors is the Hugh M. Hefner Foundation, as well as Jack Dorsey's philanthropic initiative #StartSmall. FIRE president Greg Lukianoff told Politico that the center-left Knight Foundation and Bloomberg Philanthropies were also donors.

According to New York Times journalist Cecilia Capuzzi Simon, "There are other groups that fight for First Amendment rights on campus, but none as vocal—or pushy—as FIRE." The Times also referred to FIRE as a "familiar irritant to college administrators," and said FIRE "bristles at the right-wing tag often applied to them." New York magazine has reported that the label may result from FIRE’s historic defense of conservative and heterodox professors and students on American college campuses where progressives dominate. Cathy Young, a Cato Institute fellow and columnist for The Bulwark, wrote that "FIRE has handled many cases involving speech suppression in the name of progressive values, [but] it is that rare group which actually means it when it claims to be nonpartisan", noting that it had sued on behalf of a professor who was fired because of a negative tweet about Mike Pence.

In June 2022, FIRE announced it was expanding its efforts beyond college campuses, to American society. It was renamed Foundation for Individual Rights and Expression, keeping the acronym FIRE. It detailed a $75 million expansion plan over three years to focus on "litigation, public education, and research." Josh Gerstein wrote in Politico that "part of the push may challenge the American Civil Liberties Union's primacy as a defender of free speech." Politico also wrote that FIRE would spend $10 million on "planned national cable and billboard advertising featuring activists on both ends of the political spectrum extolling the virtues of free speech." In April 2023, FIRE hosted a gala in New York City to celebrate its expanded mission. The event featured keynote remarks by rapper Killer Mike, who told the audience, "Right now, in this country, your freedom of speech is at risk."

During the second Trump administration, FIRE has defended private colleges and universities from federal attacks. In May 2025, the group signed onto a nonpartisan coalition letter urging academic institutions to defend “First Amendment rights” from the Trump administration’s “efforts to suppress speech.” In June 2025, FIRE filed a brief in support of Harvard University’s lawsuit challenging the Trump administration’s cuts in research funding, despite the group’s past criticism of Harvard’s free speech policies. The group has also supported pro-Palestinian protestors on free speech grounds. Suzanne Nossel, former president and chief executive of PEN America, said that FIRE’s non-ideological, nonpartisan approach "has made for some strange bedfellows for FIRE, but they have not flinched."

== Organization ==
FIRE is headquartered in Philadelphia, Pennsylvania, with another office in Washington, D.C. As of August 2025, FIRE has an annual budget of more than $32 million and a team of 120 employees, including a litigation department of about 20 lawyers. Staffers include progressives, libertarians, and conservatives. FIRE’s donations from individuals and foundations increased from $7.2 million in 2015 to $36.5 million in 2024. The group receives about 1,500 case inquiries a year, assisting with roughly 400 of them on average.

=== Leadership ===
First Amendment attorney and The Coddling of the American Mind co-author Greg Lukianoff serves as president and CEO. Lukianoff has criticized the ideological left and right for attacking free speech rights. Nico Perrino is executive vice president. Ira Glasser, former executive director of the American Civil Liberties Union (ACLU), serves on FIRE's Advisory Council. Former ACLU President Nadine Strossen is a Senior Fellow. Will Creeley, son of the poet Robert Creeley, is FIRE's legal director. When asked about his role at the organization in a January 2025 interview, Creeley said, "I look at the job as being an honest broker, kind of like being an ambulance driver in the culture wars. You just show up and do the job. I want to think of myself as a plumber: They don't ask about your politics; they just fix the sink."

== Policy positions ==
=== Campus speech ===
FIRE rates colleges with a red, yellow, or green light based on its assessments of speech restrictions, with a red light meaning that a college policy "both clearly and substantially restricts freedom of speech." Since 2006, the group has rated hundreds of public and private higher education institutions. FIRE's percentage of colleges with "red light" speech codes increased in 2022 for the first time in 15 years. In 2025, 73 of the 490 surveyed colleges and universities received a “green light” rating—the highest share since 2012—while nearly 15 percent fell into the “red light” category, promoting policies that FIRE says “clearly and substantially restrict free speech.” FIRE also gives colleges that do not promise their students free speech rights a "warning" rating. In 2007, George Mason University faculty member Jon Gould criticized FIRE's rating methods, arguing that FIRE had exaggerated the prevalence of unconstitutional speech codes.

In 2020, FIRE partnered with College Pulse and RealClearEducation to release the College Free Speech Rankings, a comparison of student free-speech environments at America's top college campuses. The rankings incorporate FIRE's speech code ratings, but also include surveys of students at the ranked schools. In their 2025 rankings, FIRE and College Pulse ranked more than 250 schools and surveyed over 58,000 students, with the University of Virginia achieving the top ranking and Harvard University ranking last. Bill Maher, Elon Musk, and other commentators have praised FIRE’s research. FIRE has challenged free speech zones on college campuses, claiming they are unconstitutional restrictions on First Amendment rights. The organization has provided legal support to students contesting free speech zones, while also supporting legislation to eliminate such zones. In his book Speech Out of Doors: Preserving First Amendment Liberties in Public Places (Cambridge University Press, 2008), law professor Timothy Zick wrote "in large part due to [FIRE's] litigation and other advocacy efforts, campus expressive zoning policies have been highlighted, altered, and in a number of cases repealed."

During campus protests over the Gaza war, FIRE representatives have said that colleges and universities can enact "reasonable time, place, and manner" restrictions but they must be applied in "a content viewpoint neutral manner." In 2020, FIRE created a database to monitor free speech controversies that developed at two- and four-year nonprofit institutions. Between 2020 and 2024, the group tracked over 1,000 efforts to punish students for their speech, finding that speech-related investigations and punishments from administrators and government officials accelerated at an unprecedented rate during that period.

=== Social media censorship ===
FIRE opposes efforts by the government to pressure private social media companies to censor speech on their platforms. The group argues that "efforts to 'jawbone' private platforms into granting government officials a role in decisions about content moderation must fail." FIRE chief counsel Robert Corn-Revere called a federal judge's 2023 order blocking the government from pressuring social media companies to censor "a win for the First Amendment."

=== Challenges to college residence life programs ===
In 2007, the organization said that a mandatory program for students living in dormitories at the University of Delaware resembled "thought reform". The school suspended it.

=== Student press ===
At the University of Wisconsin–Oshkosh, FIRE opposed university practices that required student journalists to submit their questions ahead of time or seek permission from the school before interviewing university employees. After FIRE intervened, the university revised its practices to no longer require prior approval before interviews.

=== Campus security fees ===
FIRE has opposed security fees some campuses charge to groups which host controversial speakers. These fees are charged to pay for extra security, which colleges say is necessary due to the likelihood of demonstrations and disruption of events. In March 2009, FIRE challenged a security fee charged to a UC Berkeley group for a speech by Elan Journo, whose pro-Israel stance was seen as likely causing clashes with pro-Palestine supporters. In 2014, FIRE assisted the Kalamazoo Peace Center in its lawsuit against Western Michigan University, after the university said the peace center could only invite social activist and rapper Boots Riley to speak on campus if it paid a security fee. The school settled the lawsuit and agreed to revise its policies. In April 2022, FIRE challenged a security fee charged to Dartmouth College's Republican group for hosting a speech by Andy Ngo.

=== Due process ===
FIRE targets situations where students and faculty are adjudicated outside the bounds of due process afforded to them by constitutional law or stated university policy. FIRE has argued for more rights for students facing sexual assault allegations. In 2011, FIRE opposed the Education Department's "Dear Colleague" letter that urged universities to use a "preponderance of the evidence" standard instead of the criminal justice system's "beyond a reasonable doubt" standard in sexual assault cases. In 2020, FIRE supported new rules made by the Department of Education during the Trump administration about sexual assault and harassment cases that required colleges to allow the cross-examination of accusers.

=== Diversity, equity, and inclusion ===
FIRE opposes some diversity, equity, and inclusion (DEI) initiatives on college campuses that it argues infringe on the free speech and academic freedom rights of students and faculty members. The organization has been particularly critical of mandatory "diversity statements" that require faculty to articulate their commitment to DEI as part of the hiring, promotion, or tenure processes. FIRE contends that such requirements often function as "ideological loyalty oaths" or "political litmus tests" that compel faculty to endorse specific viewpoints on race, equity, and identity for which there is no consensus, thereby violating academic freedom and protections against compelled speech. It has drafted model legislation to abolish the use of diversity statements.

In 2023, FIRE released a survey that asked 1,500 college faculty for their views on the use of diversity statements. Half of the respondents said they are "a justifiable requirement for a job at a university". The other half of respondents claimed they are "an ideological litmus test that violates academic freedom", including 90 percent of conservative faculty. Later that year, FIRE filed a lawsuit against the California Community Colleges system, which the organization says forces professors to promote politicized DEI concepts.

=== Public and private universities ===
FIRE has argued that public schools are required to uphold First Amendment protections for their students and faculty members because they are government entities. Although private schools are not bound by the First Amendment, FIRE has said contractual promises they make related to free speech or academic freedom should be upheld.

=== "Institutional neutrality" ===
FIRE has pushed for colleges and universities to enact "institutional neutrality" policies, which call for administrators to refrain from speaking on contentious political and social issues. In February 2024, FIRE, Heterodox Academy, and the Academic Freedom Alliance released a joint open letter calling for institutional neutrality.

=== Artificial intelligence ===
In February 2024, Lukianoff testified before Congress on artificial intelligence-powered censorship and propaganda tools. He said, "[The] most chilling threat that the government poses in the context of emerging AI is regulatory overreach that limits its potential as a tool for contributing to human knowledge." FIRE has argued against regulating AI in a way that would restrict political speech.

== Cases ==
=== Public universities ===
FIRE joined with a number of other civil liberties groups in the case of Hosty v. Carter, involving suppression of a student newspaper at Governors State University in Illinois, and has been involved in a case at Arizona State University where it condemned the listing of certain sections of a class as open only to Native American students. FIRE sparred with the University of New Hampshire in 2004 over its treatment of student Timothy Garneau, who was expelled from student housing after he wrote and distributed a flier joking that female classmates could lose the "freshman fifteen" by taking the stairs instead of the elevator. After FIRE publicly criticized the decision, Garneau was reinstated.

In 2007, Valdosta State University expelled T. Hayden Barnes, who had protested against the construction of two new parking garages on the campus which he saw as encouraging the use of private transportation. University president Ronald Zaccari misconstrued a caption of the proposed garages as the "Ronald Zaccari Memorial Parking Garage" as a threat to himself. With FIRE support, the expulsion was overturned and a court found VSU to have violated Barnes's due process rights. In 2008, college professor Kerry Laird was ordered by Temple College to remove the quote, "Gott ist tot" (God is Dead), a famous quote from Friedrich Nietzsche, from his office door. FIRE wrote a letter to the Temple administration hinting at the possibility of legal action.

In 2011, Catawba Valley Community College suspended a student (Marc Bechtol) for complaining on Facebook about a new policy that required students to sign up for a debit card to get their student ID and grant money. CVCC decided that the comments were "disturbing" and a "threat", and used that reasoning to suspend the student. FIRE took the side of the student. Charges were dropped in December 2011. In 2012, FIRE filed a lawsuit against Iowa State University (ISU) after ISU prevented the university's chapter of the National Organization for the Reform of Marijuana Laws from designing T-shirts featuring the school's mascot. The lawsuit eventually ended with nearly $1 million in damages and fees awarded. In 2014, FIRE sued Chicago State University (CSU) for trying to shut down a faculty blog critical of CSU's former administration. The school eventually agreed to rewrite its speech policies, paying $650,000 to settle the lawsuit.

In 2021, FIRE filed a First Amendment lawsuit on behalf of an Eastern Virginia Medical School student who said his free speech rights were violated when the school denied recognition to a club that he was trying to establish because it supported universal health care. In March 2022, the school settled the lawsuit. Later that year, the organization helped Stuart Reges, a professor of the University of Washington's Allen School of Computer Science, sue the school in Reges v. Cauce after it recommended that he include a Native American "land acknowledgment" on his course syllabus. FIRE is also representing conservative students at California-based Clovis Community College, where school administrators reportedly removed the students' anti-communism flyers from campus bulletin boards.

In 2021, in response to the board of trustees at the University of North Carolina at Chapel Hill declining to give Nikole Hannah-Jones tenure, FIRE released a statement saying "if it is accurate that this refusal was the result of viewpoint discrimination against Hannah-Jones, particularly based on political opposition to her appointment, this decision has disturbing implications for academic freedom." In September 2022, FIRE announced a lawsuit challenging Florida's Stop WOKE Act, arguing that the bill unconstitutionally suppresses certain discussions of race and sex on college campuses.

In November 2022, a federal judge considering lawsuits by FIRE and the ACLU stopped enforcement of the higher education portions of the law, calling them "positively dystopian" and ruling that the law violates the rights of university students and faculty members. New York Magazine's Jonathan Chait wrote that, while FIRE "has stood up against speech restriction from both the right and the left," it was notable that "the most effective opponent of left-wing political correctness" had led the effort against Florida Governor Ron DeSantis' "signature campus law." In March 2023, FIRE filed a lawsuit challenging a ban on student drag shows at West Texas A&M University, which the group called an "unlawful attempt to censor students." In a letter to the campus community, university president Walter Wendler called drag shows "divisive" and "demeaning" to women, despite acknowledging that the law appeared to require him to allow such shows.

=== Private universities ===
In 2000, FIRE criticized Columbia University's sexual misconduct policy; according to FIRE, the policy "lack[ed] even the most minimal safeguards and fundamental principles of fairness". The criticism led to the resignation of Charlene Allen, Columbia's program coordinator for the Office of Sexual Misconduct Prevention and Education, whose policies were at the center of the controversy.

FIRE criticized Brandeis University for disciplining politics professor Donald Hindley. The school's provost informed Hindley in October 2007 that comments he made in his Latin American politics class violated the school's anti-harassment policy. Hindley was alleged to have mentioned the slur "wetback" in class during a discussion about racism toward Mexican-American immigrants. Krauss placed a monitor in Hindley's class and ordered him to attend racial sensitivity training. In 2015, FIRE defended Erika Christakis, associate master of Yale University's Silliman College, after she questioned the school's Intercultural Affairs Council for highlighting the cultural implications of Halloween costumes.

In 2021, FIRE advocated on behalf of Stanford University student Nicholas Wallace, who satirized the Federalist Society and Republican political figures in an email to his peers. Wallace's diploma was initially put on hold for the email, prompting FIRE to contact Stanford in his defense. The school's investigation was ultimately dropped and Wallace was allowed to graduate. In 2022, FIRE released a series of advertisements in Boston, Massachusetts, accusing Emerson College of censoring free speech on campus. The ad campaign came in response to Emerson investigating and suspending the campus chapter of Turning Point USA, which distributed stickers featuring a hammer and sickle with the caption "China Kinda Sus" (slang for "suspicious"). Emerson claimed the stickers represented "anti-China hate", while FIRE blamed the school for violating "freedom of expression".

FIRE objected to Hamline University's 2022 decision to punish adjunct professor Erika López Prater after she showed students in her art history course a painting of the Islamic prophet Muhammad. FIRE argued this violated the professor's academic freedom rights, filing a complaint with the university's accreditor. In August 2025, FIRE represented Stanford University’s student newspaper, The Stanford Daily, in its lawsuit against Trump administration officials for their use of immigration provisions to deport noncitizens for their speech. The newspaper argued the administration’s use of the provisions violated the First Amendment and resulted in noncitizen writers and editors self-censoring.

=== Off-campus ===
In August 2022, FIRE defended the nonprofit group NeuroClastic, which had been threatened with a defamation lawsuit by the Judge Rotenberg Educational Center after criticizing the center's use of electro-shock devices. That month, FIRE challenged the New York State Senate's practice of blocking critics on Twitter, representing a resident who had criticized gun control legislation.

FIRE filed a lawsuit in December 2022 on behalf of First Amendment scholar Eugene Volokh and online platforms Rumble and Locals, challenging a New York state law that requires social networks to police hate speech on their platforms. Writing in The Wall Street Journal after the lawsuit was filed, Volokh claimed, "I don't want to moderate such content and I don't endorse the state's definition of hate speech." In February 2023, a federal judge blocked the law, writing that it "chills the constitutionally protected speech of social media users, without articulating a compelling governmental interest or ensuring that the law is narrowly tailored to that goal."

In 2022, FIRE filed a lawsuit against the city of Eastpointe, Michigan and its mayor, Monique Owens. The lawsuit alleged that Owens unconstitutionally shut down residents' criticism of her during the public comment period of city council meetings. That December, a federal judge issued an injunction that prevented Owens from interrupting or shutting down speakers at council meetings. In April 2024, the city of Eastpointe agreed to a settlement with FIRE that designated September 6 (the day that Owens shouted down residents) as “First Amendment Day".

In 2024, FIRE represented an Arizona mother who was arrested at a city council meeting for criticizing a public official, with Maricopa County Judge Gerald Williams ultimately throwing out the charges. In 2025, FIRE announced that it would defend Iowa pollster Ann Selzer against a consumer fraud lawsuit from President-elect Donald Trump over a poll released ahead of the 2024 United States presidential election which incorrectly predicted that Trump's opponent Kamala Harris would win the state of Iowa. FIRE called the lawsuit "the very definition of a 'SLAPP' suit, a Strategic Lawsuit Against Public Participation."

== Media, advertising, and sponsorships ==
Since 2011, FIRE has published a list of the "worst colleges for free speech." Since 2016, FIRE has produced "So to Speak: The Free Speech Podcast", hosted by Perrino. FIRE partnered with Korchula Productions and the DKT Liberty Project to produce Can We Take a Joke?, a documentary released in 2016 about comedy and speech. In 2017, FIRE was listed as one of the sponsors of the conservative campus group Turning Point USA's Student Action Summit, according to tax records.

In 2020, FIRE released Mighty Ira, a documentary about Ira Glasser, focusing on his advocacy for free speech and civil rights. The Hollywood Reporter described it as "a warm portrait that poses ever-urgent questions." The Times of Israel said the documentary "initiates a war between your head and your gut". In 2022, FIRE produced an advertisement featuring National Basketball Association player Enes Kanter Freedom for the 2022 Winter Olympics in China, supporting freedom of speech. Freedom also shared his personal story about censorship in his home country of Turkey.

== See also ==
- Academic bias
- Academic freedom
- Academic Freedom Alliance
- Adversarial collaboration
- Chicago principles
- Heterodox Academy
- Network for Education and Academic Rights
- Politicization of science
- Society for Academic Freedom and Scholarship
- Speech code
- Urofsky v. Gilmore
