= Society for Academic Freedom and Scholarship =

Canadian nonprofit organization

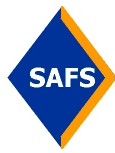
- Founded: 1992
- Type: Nonprofit
- Purpose: Maintaining freedom in teaching, research and scholarship
- Location: Halifax, Nova Scotia, Canada
- Region served: Canada
- President: Mark Mercer
- Key people: Clive Seligman (Past President); John J. Furedy (Past President); Doreen Kimura (Past President)
- Website: safs.ca

The Society for Academic Freedom and Scholarship (SAFS) is a Canadian non-profit organization founded to promote academic freedom and intellectual excellence on Canadian institutions of higher education (i.e., college and university campuses).

It opposes campus speech codes, political and religious tests for academic hiring, hate-speech legislation that restricts academic freedom, and non-merit-based affirmative action in university hiring. The SAFS also works to promote reasoned debate on a wide range of issues relating to academic freedom and scholarly excellence. Although its membership is open to the general public, the Society is composed mostly of faculty and students from Canadian universities.

== History ==
The Society for Academic Freedom and Scholarship was established in 1992 in London, Ontario. Its first newsletter was published in May 1992.

=== Founding members ===
The society's initial membership included the following founding academic officers:

- Doreen Kimura, PhD, FRSC (Psychology, University of Western Ontario) – president
- Douglas N. Jackson, PhD, FRSC (Psychology, University of Western Ontario) – secretary-treasurer
- Judy Wubnig, PhD (Philosophy, University of Waterloo) – newsletter editor
- C. Davison Ankney, PhD (Zoology, University of Western Ontario) – board member
- John J. Furedy, PhD (Psychology, University of Toronto) – board member.

== SAFS Newsletter ==
Since its founding, the SAFS has published a regular tri-annual newsletter (January, April, September), originally entitled the Society for Academic Freedom & Scholarship Newsletter, later renamed the SAFS Newsletter. The newsletter contains news articles and commentary relating to issues in higher education.

The first issue, appearing in May 1992, contained articles by Judy Wubnig and John J. Furedy, as well as announcements from the Board of Directors.

Editors of the newsletter have been as follows:

- 1992–1994: Judy Wubnig
- 1994–2000: Christine Furedy, PhD (Urban Studies, York University)
- 2000–2004: Nancy K. Innis, PhD (Psychology, University of Western Ontario)
- 2004–2015: Clive Seligman, PhD (Psychology, University of Western Ontario)
- 2015–2023: Mark Mercer
- 2023–2024: Robert Thomas
- 2024-present: Frances Widdowson

== Organization ==
The Society for Academic Freedom and Scholarship is financed solely by membership fees and voluntary donations.

=== Mandate and goals ===
In its first newsletter, the SAFS listed its central goals as being the defense of intellectual freedom and the promotion of academic excellence. Specifically, it listed the society's founding purposes as being:

(1) To resist the ideological misuse of teaching and scholarship, (2) To support rigorous standards in research and teaching in university hiring practices, and (3) To preserve academic freedom and the free exchange of ideas, regardless of popular doctrine.

Beginning in 2001, the Society began advertising its main purpose as helping to maintain "freedom in teaching, research and scholarship" and helping to defend "high standards of excellence in academic decision making concerning both students and faculty."

=== Board of directors ===
The current board of directors is composed as follows:

- Mark Mercer, PhD (Philosophy, Saint Mary's University) – president since 2015
- Janice Fiamengo, PhD (English, University of Ottawa)
- Andrew Irvine, PhD (Economics, Philosophy and Political Science, University of British Columbia)
- Steve Lupker, PhD (Psychology, University of Western Ontario)
- Clive Seligman, PhD (Psychology, University of Western Ontario) – past president
- Peter Suedfeld, PhD, FRSC (Psychology, University of British Columbia)
- Robert Thomas, MA, MLIS (Librarian, University of Regina)
- Frances Widdowson, PhD (Economics, Justice and Policy Studies, Mount Royal University).

Past presidents of the society have been:

- Doreen Kimura, University of Western Ontario (1992–93)
- John J. Furedy, University of Toronto (1993–98)
- Doreen Kimura, Simon Fraser University (1998–2000)
- Clive Seligman, University of Western Ontario (2000–15)

== Activities and influence ==
Throughout its history, SAFS has been vocal in its opposition to policies it believes are inconsistent with the goals of an open, meritocratic, academic community. It is in this context that it has spoken out against campus speech codes, hate-speech legislation that impinges on academic freedom, religious and political tests used in place of strictly academic criteria in university hiring, and non-merit-based affirmative action programs for the hiring of university faculty and librarians.

Moreover, unlike some other non-profit societies with similar goals, SAFS has been as much concerned with the academic freedom of university students as it has with the that of university faculty. Since its founding, the Society has regularly been called on by the media to comment on cases relating to academic freedom across Canada.

The SAFS has also aspired to promote reasoned debate on a wide range of cases and issues relating to academic freedom and scholarship quite broadly. In addition to sponsoring conferences and panel discussions, the SAFS makes publicly available on its official website most of its correspondence concerning cases that it has been involved with. Such correspondences—which often include replies from university administrators, union representatives, and others—provide insight into a large variety of significant Canadian cases relating to academic freedom.

According to The Globe and Mail columnist Robert Fulford, SAFS has stood up for academic freedom at a time when "fresh waves of intolerance continue to sweep across academe." Similarly, in the National Post, columnist Barbara Kay describes the Society members as "accomplished, disinterested, ruthlessly honest academics united in visceral contempt for those of their peers who are willing to bend and manipulate the truth to serve their ideological ends."

For several years the Society recognized important contributions to academic freedom through its Furedy Academic Freedom Award. Established by John and Christine Furedy in honour of John's parents, Bela and Dusi Furedy, the award recognized members of the university community, both students and faculty, who have championed academic freedom.

=== Annual General Meeting ===
The first SAFS Annual General Meeting was held on 17 May 1994 at the University of Toronto. From then on, keynote speakers and addresses have included:

- 1994: Jack Granatstein (history, York University) – “Academic Freefall: Whatever Happened to Free Speech?”
- 1995: John Fekete (cultural studies and english literature, Trent University) – “Moral Panic: Biopolitics and Academic Freedom”
- 1996: N/A
- 1997: Barry Smith (philosophy, SUNY at Buffalo) – “The Open Society and Its New (Multiculturalist) Enemies”
- 1998–99: N/A
- 2001: Margaret Wente (columnist, Globe and Mail) – “Moral Panics and The Media,” Margaret Wente (Globe and Mail)
- 2002: Alan Kors (history, University of Pennsylvania; president & co-founder, Foundation for Individual Rights in Education, or FIRE) – “Betrayal of Liberty and Dignity on America’s Campuses”
- 2003: Frederick Lowy (rector and vice-chancellor, Concordia University) – “Defending Academic Freedom in the Politicized University,”
- 2004: N/A
- 2005: Stephen Balch (president, National Association of Scholars) – “Reopening the Intellectual Marketplace in Academe”
- 2006: Salim Mansur (political science, University of Western Ontario) – “Has The Danish Cartoon Controversy Pushed The World To A Tipping Point In The Clash Or Crash Of Civilizations?”
- 2007: James Turk (executive director, Canadian Association of University Teachers) – “Academic Freedom”
- 2008: Anton Allahar and Jim Côté (sociology, University of Western Ontario) – “Ivory Tower Blues: A University System in Crisis”
- 2009: Barbara Kay (columnist, National Post) – “Manipulating Debate: Anti-Israel Rhetoric and Political Activism on Universities Worldwide”
- 2010: no meeting
- 2011: John Carpay (founder & president, Justice Centre for Constitutional Freedoms) – “Freedom of Speech on Canadian Campuses”
- 2012: Gábor Lukács (fmr. mathematics, University of Manitoba) – “Is Academic Integrity adequately promoted by Academic Governance, Collective Bargaining, and Judicial Review?”
- 2013: Peter Wood (president, National Association of Scholars) – “What does Bowdoin teach? An examination of the current content of a liberal arts college”
- 2014: Greg Lukianoff (president, FIRE) – “Unlearning Liberty: Campus Censorship and the End of American Debate”
- 2015: Janice Fiamengo (English, University of Ottawa) – “From Micro-Aggression to BDS: Can Humanities Education Be Saved from Social Justice?”
- 2016: Donald Alexander Downs (political science, law, and journalism, University of Wisconsin–Madison; director & co-founder, Wisconsin Center for the Study of Liberal Democracy) – “Challenges to Academic Freedom: Anything New Under the Sun?”
- 2017: Jordan Peterson (psychology, University of Toronto; clinical psychologist) – “Why freedom of speech is not just another value”
- 2018: Gad Saad (evolutionary psychology; marketing, John Molson School of Business) – “A Tsunami of Maladies Afflicting the Soul of Our Universities”
- 2019: Rachel Fulton Brown (history, University of Chicago) – “Is Academia Good for the Soul?”
- 2020: Samir Gandesha (humanities, Simon Fraser University) – “Is Academic Freedom Under Attack in the Canadian University?”
- 2021 (May 21): Tomáš Hudlický (chemistry, Brock University) – Hudlický will discuss what happened after a journal pulled his critique of trends in chemistry research and teaching.

== See also ==
- Academic Freedom
- Academic tenure
- Chicago principles
- Foundation for Individual Rights in Education (FIRE)
- Heterodox Academy
- National Association of Scholars (NAS)
- Speech code
