= Heterodox Academy =

American nonprofit advocacy group

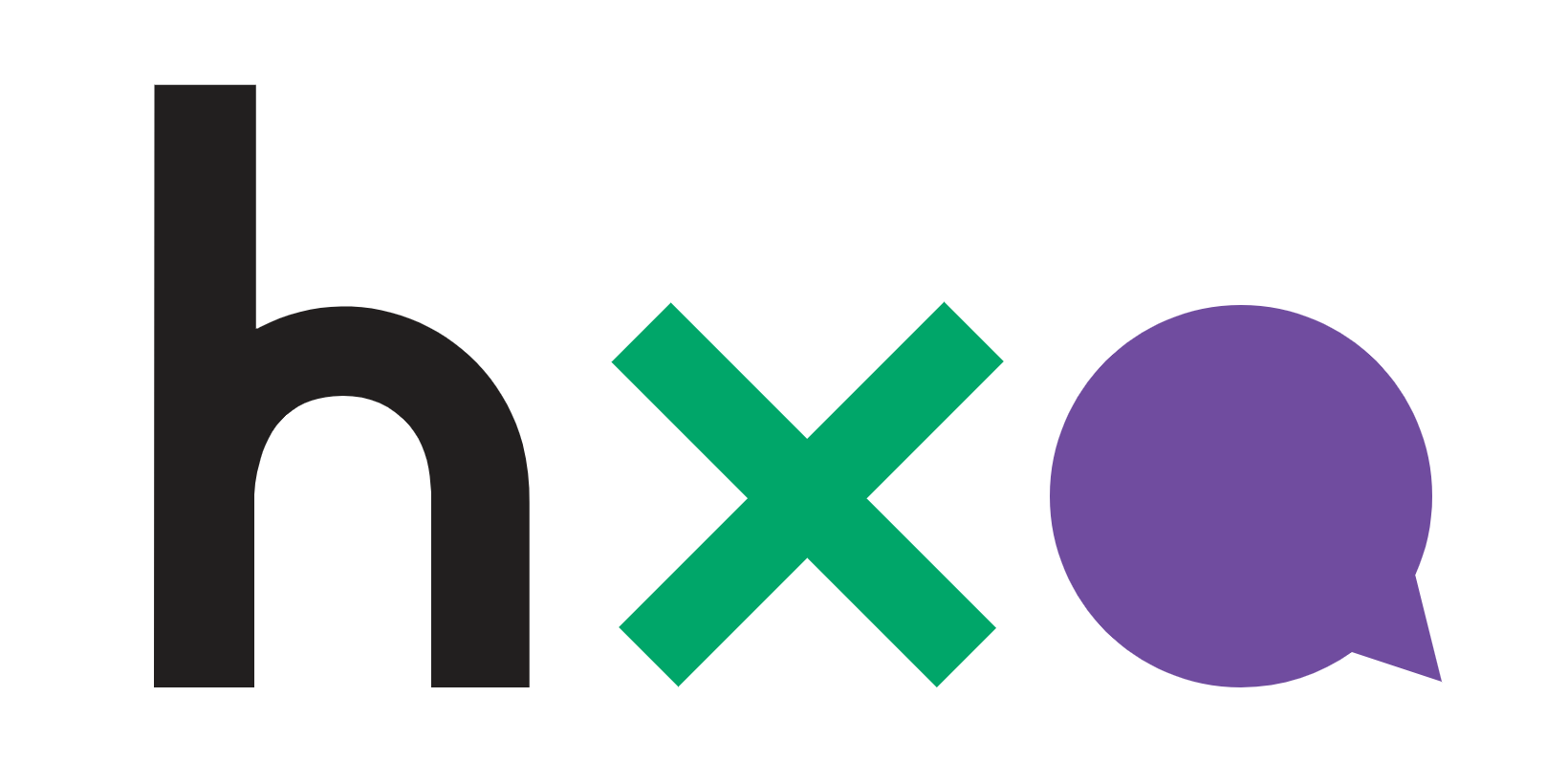
- Abbreviation: HxA
- Formation: 2015; 11 years ago
- Founders: Jonathan Haidt, Chris C. Martin, and Nicholas Quinn Rosenkranz
- Type: 501(c)(3) organization
- Tax ID no.: 82-2903153
- Location: New York City, U.S.
- President: John Tomasi
- Executive Director: Michael Regnier
- Chair, Board of Directors: Jeffrey Flier
- Website: heterodoxacademy.org

Heterodox Academy (HxA) is a nonprofit advocacy group of academics working to counteract what they see as a lack of viewpoint diversity on college campuses, specifically political diversity. The organization was founded in 2015 by Jonathan Haidt, Nicholas Quinn Rosenkranz, and Chris Martin, who each cited a lack of politically conservative viewpoints in their academic disciplines. As of 2025, the organization had approximately 7,000 members in both faculty and non-faculty positions across 22 countries.

== History ==
In 2011, Jonathan Haidt, a psychology professor at the University of Virginia, gave a talk at the Society for Personality and Social Psychology in which he argued that American conservatives were underrepresented in social psychology and that this hinders research and damages the field's credibility. In 2014, along with political psychologist Philip Tetlock, social psychologist Lee Jussim and others, Haidt published the paper "Political diversity will improve social psychological science". In 2015, Haidt was contacted by Nicholas Quinn Rosenkranz, a Georgetown University law professor, who had given a talk to the Federalist Society discussing a similar lack of conservatives in law and similarly argued that this undermines the quality of research and teaching. Haidt says he was also contacted by Chris Martin, a sociology graduate student who had published a similar paper about a lack of ideological diversity in sociology. Haidt, Martin, and Rosenkranz formed "Heterodox Academy" to address this issue.

Initial funding for the group came from the Richard Lounsbery Foundation and The Achelis and Bodman Foundation. The Heterodox Academy website was launched with 25 members in September 2015. A series of campus freedom of speech controversies, such as those surrounding Erika Christakis at Yale University and the 2015–2016 University of Missouri protests, coincided with an increase in membership.

Membership was initially open to tenured and pre-tenure professors, but has been expanded to a range of other faculty ranks (including career/full-time as well as adjunct/part-time), and non-faculty positions such as graduate students and postdoctoral researchers. Initially, the group had a selective membership application process which was partly intended to address imbalances toward any particular political ideology. In 2017, Heterodox Academy had about 800 total members. By 2018, about 1,500 professors had joined, along with a couple hundred graduate students.

In 2018, Debra Mashek, a professor of psychology at Harvey Mudd College, was appointed as the executive director of Heterodox Academy. Mashek held the position until 2020, after which an interim executive director was appointed. In 2020, the organization had around 4,000 members. John Tomasi, a political philosopher at Brown University, became the first president of Heterodox Academy in 2022. In 2022, Michael Regnier became executive director. As of 2023, total membership was approximately 5,000. As of 2025, it was 7,000 members.

== Programs and activities ==
In June 2018, Heterodox Academy held an inaugural Open Mind Conference in New York City, featuring several academic guests recently involved in campus free speech issues, like Robert Zimmer, Lucía Martínez Valdivia, Allison Stanger, Alice Dreger, and Heather Heying.

The organization administers a "Campus Expression Survey", designed to allow professors and college administrators to survey their students' feelings about freedom of expression on campus.

Heterodox Academy has advocated for institutional neutrality policies. In February 2024, Heterodox Academy, the Foundation for Individual Rights and Expression and the Academic Freedom Alliance "released a joint open letter calling for institutional neutrality". In March 2025, Heterodox Academy released a report tracking the adoption of institutional neutrality statements by colleges, which saw a significant increase after the October 7 attacks, the ensuing war and campus protests.

== Ideology and reception ==
In 2018, the group's website described its mission as encouraging political diversity to allow dissent and challenge errors.

In a study responding to Heterodox Academy's contentions of bias against conservative professors, Jeffrey Adam Sachs, a professor of political science at Canada's Acadia University, found that liberal professors were more often dismissed for their speech than were conservative professors. He argued in a Heterodox Academy podcast and elsewhere that the campus free speech crisis was "a myth" and "largely imaginary".

According to Vox's Zack Beauchamp, Heterodox Academy advances conservative viewpoints on college campuses by ignoring the data and arguing that such views are suppressed by left-wing bias or political correctness. In the same 2019 article, Beauchamp argues that advocacy groups such as Heterodox Academy do more to narrow the scope of academic debates than any of the biases they allege.

Speaking at Heterodox Academy's conference in 2022, Wesleyan University president Michael Roth, who has advocated for viewpoint diversity in the past, challenged Haidt's assertion that academia had been "taken over" by the progressive left, and said that Haidt had been silent about the threat to academic freedom posed by Donald Trump.

== See also ==
- Chicago principles
- Foundation for Individual Rights and Expression
- Society for Academic Freedom and Scholarship
- Academic Freedom Alliance
- Self censorship
- Freedom of speech in schools in the United States
- Viewpoint diversity
- Cognitive bias mitigation
- Braver Angels
- Adversarial collaboration
