= OFAH =

OFAH may refer to:

- Only Fools and Horses, a British television sitcom
- The Ontario Federation of Anglers and Hunters, a Canadian conservation organisation
