= Ankney =

Ankney is a surname. Notable people with the surname include:

- C. Davison Ankney (1946–2013), Canadian zoologist and ecologist
- Duane Ankney (born 1946), American politician
- Moe Ankney (born 1942), American football player and coach
- Pete Ankney (born c. 1932), American football coach
