= John J. Furedy =

Psychophysiologist (1940–2016)

- Born: 30 June 1940; Budapest, Hungary
- Died: 23 August 2016 (aged 76); Sydney
- Education: University of Sydney
- Known for: Psychological research; support of academic freedom
- Scientific career
- Fields: Psychophysiology, biofeedback and academic freedom
- Workplaces: University of Toronto
- Doctoral advisors: Richard A. Champion

John J. Furedy (June 30, 1940 – August 23, 2016) was a Hungarian-born Australian and Canadian psychophysiologist and distinguished research professor of psychology at the University of Toronto, noted for his extensive empirical research into the unreliability of the polygraph test in lie detection and similar problems associated with biofeedback, as well as addressing contemporary issues concerning academic freedom.

== Biography ==
Furedy was born into a Hungarian Jewish family, the son of Bela and Dusi Furedy. Having emigrated with his parents from a totalitarian society, and influenced by the intellectual zeitgeist at the University of Sydney in the late 1950s and the promotion of free speech by the then Challis Professor of Philosophy John Anderson (philosopher), Furedy, who regarded himself as an Andersonian realist, also cherished and was keen to articulate the principle of academic freedom. His personal interests included bridge, tennis, body surfing and cross country skiing. His obituary in the National Post read in part... "He cycled to work summer and winter, wearing a Hawaiian shirt, parking his cycle in his office, crowding the colleagues who joined him for a lunchtime bridge game'. In 2005, Furedy retired and returned to Australia with his wife, Christine. He died on August 24, 2016, at his home in Sydney aged 76 years.

== Academic career ==
After emigrating with his parents to Australia, Furedy attended the academically selective North Sydney Boys High School and subsequently became an "Old Falconian" (see List of Old Falconians). Several years later, Furedy graduated from the prestigious University of Sydney with a Ph.D. in psychology (his academic advisor was Dick Champion) and prior to that he had graduated with an M.A. in psychology (with first-class honours), and a separate B.A. (Hons) degree in philosophy and psychology (with first class honours in both disciplines and the rare distinction of winning the University Medal in psychology). In 1967, he joined the academic faculty at the University of Toronto as an assistant professor of psychology immediately following two years as a visiting faculty member at the Indiana University. Furedy was promoted to associate professor at the University of Toronto in 1969, and subsequently to full professor in 1975 (until his retirement in 2005 and his appointment as emeritus professor).

== Research interests ==
Funded repeatedly by the National Science and Engineering Research Council of Canada, Furedy ran a state-of-the-art psychophysiology laboratory, advising and collaborating with undergraduates, graduates and post-doctoral students until 1995. From then on, he undertook an extensive "merit vs. equity" research program supported by the Donner Canadian Foundation. According to the National Post, "Colleagues and students found him an incisive and critical thinker, determined and principled, able to disagree with opinions without personal animosity, having a sharp wit and a generous spirit".

Furedy's research interests (expressed in over 400 mostly peer-reviewed publications) spanned across various areas in psychophysiology (such as lie detection and biofeedback), philosophy of science applied to psychology as a scientific discipline, and the over-reliance on the information-processing, computer metaphor in cognitive psychology, as well as human sex differences in cognitive functions and processes. Influenced by the realist Scottish-Australian philosopher John Anderson, Furedy (who regarded himself as an Andersonian realist) also had a strong passion in advocating the Socratic approach to higher education. Highly published in the experimental psychology peer-reviewed literature, he not only wrote conceptual pieces, but, also undertook empirical research into how universities balance the conflicting demands of "merit" and "equity" (or affirmative action") in their hiring policies, as reflected in the phraseology of their tenure-stream advertisements, including cultural aspects. Over the years, Furedy was actively engaged in several research organizations, including the Anti-polygraph organization, the Centre for Study of Civic Renewal, and the Pavlovian Society. More recently, Furedy has collaborated on research into "brain fingerprinting".

== Honors and awards ==
During his academic career, aside from receiving numerous scholarships, Furedy was recipient of many Honors and Awards, including:

- Gantt Medal of the Pavlovian Society for distinguished scholarly contributions and long-standing service, 2000.
- Elected Charter Fellow of the American Association of Applied and Preventive Psychology, 1992.
- Soros Foundation Travelling Fellow (International Conference of Educational Philosophers, Pecs, Hungary), August, 1988.
- Award for Research Excellence, Pavlovian Society of North America, 1982.
- Elected Fellow of the Teaching of Psychology Division of the American Psychological Association, 1982.
- Elected Fellow of the International Organization of Psychophysiology, 1982.
- Elected Fellow of the Physiological and Comparative Division of the American Psychological Association, 1978.
- Elected Fellow of the American Psychological Association (Division of Experimental Psychology), 1976.
- Elected Fellow of the International College of Psychosomatic Medicine, 1975.
- Elected Fellow of the Canadian Psychological Association, 1974.

== Inaccuracy of polygraph for lie detection ==
Furedy served on the Curriculum and Research Guidance Committee of the then US Department of Defense Polygraph Institute, advising against pseudoscientific polygraph screening for lie-detection in the 1990s because of evidence-based concerns about its inaccuracy and unreliability. Furedy was outspoken in exposing use of the polygraph for lie detection as fraudulent and abusive. Furedy concurred with other eminent psychophysiologists that polygraph "testing" (despite being shamelessly and irresponsibly promoted in the mass media) has no actual scientific basis, being almost entirely dependent on an individual's ignorance and propensity to experience fear. The Lie Behind The Lie Detector aimed to "call public attention to the dangers of polygraphy and to protect the innocent from polygraph abuse. Because of...reliance on this pseudoscientific procedure, thousands of truthful persons have been falsely accused of deception and suffered serious adverse consequences. On the other hand, deceptive persons can easily defeat polygraph "tests" through countermeasures, as did convicted spy Aldrich H. Ames."

== Society for Academic Freedom and Scholarship ==
Furedy was also a founding member and onetime president of the Society for Academic Freedom and Scholarship.

== Publications ==
Selected Papers

- Farwell, L.A., Richardson, D.C., Richardson, G.M., & Furedy, J.J. (2014). Brain fingerprinting classification concealed information test detects US Navy military medical information with P300. Frontiers in Neuroscience, 8, 1-21.
- Ben-Shakhar, G., & Furedy, J.J. (2012). Theories and applications in the detection of deception: A psychophysiological and international perspective. Springer Science & Business Media.
- Furedy, J.J., & Furedy, C. (2012). From the Socratic to the Sophistic. Quadrant, LVI(11), 45-49.
- Boyle, G.J., Furedy, J.J., Neumann, D.L. et al. (2010). Balance between merit and equity in academic hiring decisions: Judgemental content analysis applied to the phraseology of Australian tenure-stream advertisements in comparison with Canadian advertisements. Australian Universities Review, 52, 49-55.
- Rosenfeld, J.P., Biroschak, J.R., & Furedy, J.J. (2006), P300-based detection of concealed autobiographical versus incidentally acquired information in target and non-target paradigms. International Journal of Psychophysiology, 60, 251-259.
- Furedy, J.J. (2004). Aping Newtonian physics but ignoring brute facts will not transform Skinnerian psychology into genuine science or useful technology. Behavioral and Brain Sciences, 27, 693-694.
- Furedy, J.J. (2002). Reflections on the Düring and Brand cases: political correctness and the current abandonment of academic autonomy in the culture of comfort. Journal of Economic Studies, Vol. 29, 4/5, 332-344.
- Furedy, J.J., & Pogun, S. (2001). An investigative biobehavioral approach to sex differences in cognitive functioning. Sexuality & Culture, 5, 13-21.
- Furedy, J.J. (2000) A Pavlovian in spirit: Richard Annels Champion (1925-1999). Integrative Physiological and Behavioral Science, 35, 5-16.
- Kanit, L., Taskiran, D., Yilmaz, O.A., Balkan, B., Demirgoren, S., Furedy, J.J. & Pogun, S. (2000). Sexually dimorphic cognitive style in rats emerges after puberty. Brain Research Bulletin, 52, 243-248.
- Furedy, J.J. (1999). On the limited role of the "single-subject" design in psychology: Hypothesis generating but not testing. Journal of Behavior Therapy and Experimental Psychiatry, 30, 21-22.
- Furedy, J.J. (1998). On the predictive value of TWA for cardiovascular disease. Biological Psychology, 48, 301-303.
- Kanit, I., Tabkyran, D., Furedy, J.J. et al. (1998). Nicotine interacts with sex in affecting rat choice between "look-out" and "navigational" cognitive styles in the Morris water maze place learning task. Brain Research Bulletin, 45, 441-445.
- Furedy, J.J. (1997). Velvet totalitarianism on Canadian campuses: Subverting effects on the teaching of, and research in, the discipline of psychology. Canadian Psychology, 38, 204-211.
- Furedy, J.J. (1996). The North American polygraph and psychophysiology: Disinterested, uninterested, and interested perspectives. International Journal of Psychophysiology, 21, 97-105.
- Algan, O., Furedy, J.J., Demirgoren, S., Vincent, A., & Pogun, S. (1997). Effects of tobacco smoking and gender on interhemispheric cognitive function: Performance and confidence measures. Behavioural Pharmacology, 8, 416-428.
- Furedy, J.J., & Kristjansson, M. (1996). Human Pavlovian autonomic conditioning and its relation to awareness of the CS/US contingency: Focus on the phenomenon and some forgotten facts. Behavioral and Brain Sciences, 19, 555-56.
- Malmo, R.B., & Furedy, J.J. (1993). Settling the stimulus- substitution issue is propedeutic to sound ateologocial neural analysis of heart-rate deceleration conditioning. Behavioral and Brain Sciences, 16, 392-393.
- Muter, P.M., Furedy, J.J., Vincent, A., & Pelcowitz, T. (1992). User-hostile systems and patterns of psychophysiological activity. Computers in Human Behavior, 9, 105-111.
- Furedy, J.J. (1991). Realist versus instrumentalist approaches to clarifying the conditions for orienting response habituation. Journal of Experimental Psychology: General, 12, 106-109.
- Furedy, J.J. (1989). The North American CQT Polygraph and the legal profession: A case of Canadian credulity and a cause for cultural concern. Criminal Law Quarterly, 31, 431-51.
- Furedy, J.J., Davis, C., & Gurevich, M. (1988). Differentiation of deception as a psychological process: A psychophysiological approach. Psychophysiology, 25, 683-688.
- Furedy, J.J. (1987). Beyond heart-rate in the cardiac psychophysiological assessment of mental effort: The T-wave amplitude component of the electrocardiogram. Human Factors, 29, 183-94.
- Furedy, J.J., & Shulhan, D. (1987). Specific versus placebo effects in biofeedback: Some brief back-to-basics considerations. Biofeedback and Self-Regulation, 12, 211-15.
- Furedy, J.J. (1987). Why peer-reviewed research funding may negate the critical benefits of open journal review: It's not the show but the dough. American Psychologist, 42, 267.
- Furedy, J.J., & Biederman, G.B. (1986). Rationalist versus empirical approaches to observing and conditioned reinforcement: The (so-called) preference-for-signaled-shock phenomenon. Behavioral and Brain Sciences, 9, 367-368.
- Furedy, J.J. (1985). Specific vs. placebo effects in biofeedback: Science-based vs. snake-oil behavioral medicine. Clinical Biofeedback and Health: An International Journal, 8, 110-118.
- Furedy, J.J., & Furedy, C.P. (1979). Daniel Berlyne and psychonomy: The beat of a different drum. Bulletin of the Psychonomic Society, 12, 203-205.
- Furedy, J.J. & Wenderoth, P. (1979). The Australian Ph.D. examination system: A critique and a proposal for reform. Australian Psychologist, 14, 370-374.
- Dawson, M.E., & Furedy, J.J. (1975). The role of awareness in human differential autonomic classical conditioning: The necessary-gate hypothesis. Psychophysiology, 13, 50-53.
- Furedy, J.J., & Stanley, G. (1970). The apparent size of "projected" after- images under conditions where size-constancy holds. Perception and Psychophysics, 7, 165-168.
- Furedy, J.J. (1968). Human orienting reaction as a function of electrodermal-versus plethysmographic response modes and single versus alternating stimulus series. Journal of Experimental Psychology, 77, 70-78.
- Stanley, G.V., & Furedy, J.J. (1966). Size constancy and Emmert's law of apparent sizes. Australian Journal of Psychology, 18, 255-261.
- Furedy, J.J., & Champion, R.A. (1963). Cognitive and S-R interpretations of incentive-motivational phenomena. American Journal of Psychology, 76, 616-623.
