= Urofsky v. Gilmore =

2000 American legal case

- Court: United States Court of Appeals for the Fourth Circuit
- Full case name: Melvin I. Urofsky, et al. v. James S. Gilmore, III
- Decided: June 23, 2000
- Citation: 216 F.3d 401 (4th Cir. 2000)

Case history
- Prior actions: Urofsky v. Allen, Civil Action No. 97-701-A (United States District Court for the Eastern District of Virginia)
- Appealed from: United States District Court for the Eastern District of Virginia
- Appealed to: Supreme Court of the United States
- Subsequent action: Supreme Court certiorari denied.

Court membership
- Judges sitting: United States Court of Appeals for the Fourth Circuit, en banc

Keywords
- First Amendment to the United States Constitution, freedom of speech, obscenity, sexually explicit

Urofsky v. Gilmore, 216 F.3d 401 (4th Cir. 2000), is a case decided before the United States Court of Appeals for the Fourth Circuit which concerned the matter of professors challenging the constitutionality of Virginia law restricting access to sexually explicit material on work computers. The American Civil Liberties Union (ACLU) joined the professors in the case against the state of Virginia. A three-judge panel of the Fourth Circuit overturned an earlier ruling by the District Court, and upheld the Virginia law.

The ACLU then requested an en banc hearing of the entire Fourth Circuit, which determined that university instructors do not have a right guaranteed by the United States Constitution to view sexually explicit material on facility computers. The ACLU then appealed this decision to the Supreme Court of the United States. The Supreme Court refused to hear the case, and the ruling by the Fourth Circuit remained in effect.

== Background ==
Six university instructors in Virginia sued contesting a state regulation which prohibited them as state employees from viewing sexually explicit material on work computers. The six professors' research included an academic study of Internet pornography. Professor Melvin Urofsky of Virginia Commonwealth University was the lead plaintiff. They asserted that this prohibition violated their rights under the First Amendment to the United States Constitution.

The legislation challenged was originally passed by the Virginia General Assembly in 1996, and then later amended in 1999. The six college instructors argued that the legislation resulted in chilled speech leading to a limited role and decreased capacity for them to teach and perform academic research. The university professors were joined in their case against the state by the American Civil Liberties Union (ACLU). The academic specialties of the professors included poet Algernon Charles Swinburne, and the subject of human sexuality.

One of the plaintiffs was a professor who focused her research in queer studies, women's studies, and gender studies. She told The Virginian-Pilot that she was not sure whether she was able to study the topic of human sexuality online due to the Virginia law. Another professor in the case said he chose not to give his class an assignment studying indecency law on the Internet due to his concern he could not confirm their research online.

== Case history ==
=== District Court ===
The representative for the Virginia Attorney General was quoted in The Virginian-Pilot: "This case is not about censorship or regulating the Internet. The issue is about appropriate use of taxpayer funds. The taxpayers of Virginia should not be forced to pay for the use of state computers—on state time—by state employees for downloading pornography off the Internet."

In 1998, a ruling by the District Court in the case invalidated the Virginia law.

=== Fourth Circuit ===
==== Panel ruling ====
In February 1999 a judgment by a three-judge panel of the Fourth Circuit overturned the District Court ruling, and upheld the law. The ACLU then requested an en banc hearing before the entire Fourth Circuit.

The executive director of the ACLU of Virginia commented on the Fourth Circuit's decision, "In many ways this ushers in a new era in which college professors will have to seek permission for what they do."

==== En Banc hearing ====
On October 25, 1999, en banc panel of the United States Court of Appeals for the Fourth Circuit reheard the case before the court.

==== Decision ====
The United States Court of Appeals for the Fourth Circuit issued their decision from the full circuit panel of judges on June 23, 2000. The Fourth Circuit determined that university instructors do not have a right guaranteed by the United States Constitution to view sexually explicit on facility computers. In its ruling, the court upheld Virginia legislation which disallowed state workers from viewing such material on state computers unless it was part of a study project previously sanctioned. The court decided that because these employees were workers for the state, their study was not a form of protected speech. The Fourth Circuit ruled that the legal challenge, "amounts to a claim that academic freedom of professors is not only a professional norm, but also a constitutional right. We disagree."

=== Supreme Court ===
In July 2000, the Virginia chapter of the ACLU decided to appeal the decision of the full Fourth Circuit to the Supreme Court of the United States. The executive director of the ACLU of Virginia stated to The Virginian-Pilot, "This decision has so thoroughly eviscerated the free-speech rights of public employees that we believe the U.S. Supreme Court will be willing to review this case and reverse the decision. Worst of all is that the 4th Circuit has essentially ruled there is no such thing as academic freedom. The Supreme Court may not go along with that." The Supreme Court refused to hear the case further, and the thus the decision of the Fourth Circuit remained in effect.

== Impact ==
After the District Court struck down the Virginia law but before the case was heard by the first three-judge panel in the Fourth Circuit Court of Appeals, the Virginia House of Delegates moved to pass legislation which would effectively repeal the law. The proposed bill, HB2343, gained support from the Virginia House of Delegates' Committee on Science and Technology on February 5, 1999. HB2343 was intended to replace the prior Virginia law, and instead provide more lenient rules that necessitated state government groups form appropriate guidelines including harsh sanctions for downloading or watching sexually explicit material in the workplace. The bill moved to the entire Virginia House of Delegates in February 1999. After realizing the judicial system had not completed analyzing the law, the Virginia General Assembly ceased deliberation over whether to repeal the original bill.

== Analysis ==
Writing in the Journal of Personnel Evaluation in Education, authors Kevin Kinser and Richard Fossey commented: "With the U.S. Supreme Court having declined review of the Fourth Circuit's opinion, the ruling in Urofsky diminishes the significance of academic freedom as a constraint on personnel decisions by academic administrators whose responsibility include the supervision of professors."

== See also ==
- Academic freedom
- Freedom of speech
- Network for Education and Academic Rights
- Politicization of science
- Scholars at Risk
- Scientific freedom
- Society for Academic Freedom and Scholarship
- Speech code
