= Chicago Principles =

Free speech principles held by United States colleges

The Chicago Principles (also referred to as the Chicago Statement) are a set of guiding principles intended to demonstrate a commitment to freedom of speech and freedom of expression on college campuses in the United States. Initially adopted by the University of Chicago following a report issued by the designated Committee on Freedom of Expression formed in 2014, they came to be known as the "Chicago Statement" or "Chicago Principles”. The Foundation for Individual Rights in Education (FIRE) then led a campaign to encourage other universities to sign up in support of the principles or model their own based on similar goals.

Since 2015, a number of other universities have committed to the principles, including Princeton, Purdue, and Stanford University. As of September 2024, FIRE reported that 110 U.S. colleges and universities had "adopted or endorsed the Chicago Statement or a substantially similar statement."

== Context and formulation ==
Following a series of incidents in 2014 where students at various schools sought to prevent controversial commencement speakers, the Committee on Freedom of Expression at the University of Chicago was formed and charged by the President Robert J. Zimmer and Provost Eric D. Isaacs in July 2014, to draft a statement that would articulate the University of Chicago's "overarching commitment to free, robust, and uninhibited debate and deliberation among all members of the University’s community."

== Statement ==
The report cited historical precedents by former University presidents, William Rainey Harper in 1902, Robert M. Hutchins in 1932, (Note: Hutchins defended the right of the students to invite a Communist Party member, William Z. Foster.) Edward H. Levi in 1968, and Hanna Holborn Gray, who was president from 1978 to 1993. The committee returned a report which re-emphasized the school's commitment to principles of free expression as "an essential element of the University’s culture." The report clarified that the responsibility on the part of the university community for maintaining a climate of civility and mutual respect, is not a justification to prevent "discussion of ideas, even if "some or even by most members of the University" find them "disagreeable", "offensive, unwise, immoral, or wrong-headed."

"Narrow exceptions to the general principle of freedom of expression" may include restrictions on "expression that violates the law, that falsely defames a specific individual, that constitutes a genuine threat or harassment, that unjustifiably invades substantial privacy or confidentiality interests, or that is otherwise directly incompatible with the functioning of the University. In addition, the University may reasonably regulate the time, place, and manner of expression to ensure that it does not disrupt the ordinary activities of the University."

The committee wrote that the university's responsibility is twofold, to "promote a lively and fearless freedom of debate and deliberation, but also to protect that freedom when others attempt to restrict it."

== Response ==
The University of Chicago's commitment to free speech gained national media attention in August 2016, when Dean of Students John Ellison sent a letter to the incoming freshman class of 2020 affirming the free speech principles and stating that the university did not support the use of trigger warnings or safe spaces. In adopting the principles, Purdue University president Mitch Daniels later said "we didn’t see how we could improve on the language." In August 2018, the province of Ontario required all colleges and universities to develop and comply with a free speech policy based on the Chicago Principles.

While the campaign to adopt the Chicago Principles has gained traction among both public and private universities, some critics have challenged the cut-and-paste nature of the principles as discouraging active debate on university campuses. Other outlets have suggested that the campaign is a University of Chicago marketing ploy or a way to ignore student activism.

== See also ==
- Academic freedom
- Heterodox Academy
- National Association of Scholars
- Society for Academic Freedom and Scholarship
