= Lynn Nelson =

Lynn Nelson may refer to:

- Lynn Nelson (baseball) (1905–1955), American baseball pitcher
- Lynn Nelson (runner) (born 1962), American long-distance runner
- G. Lynn Nelson, American author and academic
- Lynn Skrifvars (born 1951), American swimmer, also known by her married name Lynn Nelson
- Lynn Nelson (wheelchair rugby), American Paralympic wheelchair rugby player
