= Speech code =

Non-statutory restriction on word choice

A speech code is any rule or regulation that limits, restricts, or bans speech beyond the strict legal limitations upon freedom of speech or press found in the legal definitions of harassment, slander, libel, and fighting words. Such codes are common in the workplace, in universities, and in private organizations. The term may be applied to regulations that do not explicitly prohibit particular words or sentences. Speech codes are often applied for the purpose of suppressing hate speech or forms of social discourse thought to be disagreeable to the implementers.

Use of the term is in many cases valuable; those opposing a particular regulation may refer to it as a speech code, while supporters will prefer to describe it as, for example and depending on the circumstances, a harassment policy. This is particularly the case in academic contexts.

== Banned word ==
A banned word is one whose use is prohibited by law or culture or organization policy. An example would be the Ban Bossy campaign. Some companies, such as Instagram, allow users to decide for themselves what words to ban from being used on their pages (e.g. in comments sections). Most often, banned words, or entire phrases, relate to Holocaust denial and racist or sexist speech. The most stringent of such policies may include a ban on anything deemed offensive, such as ridicule against another person.

== United States universities ==
In the United States, the Supreme Court has not issued a direct ruling on whether speech codes are unconstitutional, but has ruled against their implementation within public universities. However, the United States District Court for the Eastern District of Michigan has struck down a speech code at the University of Michigan, indicating that broad speech codes seeking to prohibit hate speech probably violate the First Amendment (Doe v. University of Michigan, 1989). Subsequent challenges against such language as part of harassment policies, diversity mandates, and so forth instead of being self-identified as speech codes have generally succeeded to date. Nadine Strossen writes that in the 1980s, when the ACLU sued on the matter, "hate speech" codes were invariably struck down as unduly vague and overbroad (a key constitutional criterion), and all subsequent codes directed against specific viewpoints would fail under the same standard.

One web site describes behavior that speech codes are meant to prevent:

Discriminatory harassment includes conduct (oral, written, graphic or physical) directed against any person or, group of persons because of their race, color, national origin, religion, sex, sexual orientation, age, disability, or veteran's status and that has the purpose or reasonably foreseeable effect of creating an offensive, demeaning, intimidating, or hostile environment for that person or group of persons.

Today, most talk of speech codes is within institutional contexts and refer to colleges and refers to official lists and rules established by authorities, where speech codes are occasionally used by colleges and universities to suppress speech that others find offensive. Alan Charles Kors and Harvey Silverglate, in their work The Shadow University, published in 1998, refer to a number of cases in which speech codes have been used by public and private universities to suppress academic freedom, as well as the freedom of speech, and deny due process of law (for public institutions), or violate explicit and implicit guarantees of fairness declared or implied in a student's contract of enrollment or a faculty member's contract of employment with the institution of higher education in question (at private institutions (Note: For example, if a private institution declares or implies that their code of conduct will treat those subject to it fairly, then a court will require an institution to uphold their promises of fairness, under the implied covenant of good faith and fair dealing, even if the institution disclaims that it is a contract. Contrary to this, if an institution openly, willingly, and publicly declares their code of conduct is completely arbitrary and capricious, and discipline is carried out at the slightest whim of higher authorities, then no court will inquire as to how they conduct their business.)).

One particular case, the University of Pennsylvania "Water Buffalo" case, highlighted reasons for and against speech codes and is typical of such cases. In the University of Pennsylvania case, a freshman faced expulsion from that private school when he called African-American sorority members who were making substantial amounts of noise and disturbing his sleep during the middle of the night "water buffalo" (the charged student claimed not to intend discrimination, as the individual in question spoke the modern Hebrew language, and the term "water buffalo", or "behema", in modern Hebrew, is slang for a rude or an insulting person; moreover, water buffalo are native to Asia rather than Africa). Some saw the statement as racist while others simply saw it as a general insult. Questions were raised about how far was too far when interpreting and punishing statements like the one in question. The college eventually dropped the charges amid national criticism.

== Purposes ==
There are two distinct reasons given for the implementation of speech codes, most often given in the context of higher education institutions. The first is as follows, "First, to protect vulnerable students from threatening, truly harassing speech that amounts to 'fighting words,' which are not protected by the First Amendment".

The second reason is more abstract, leaving room for argument both for and against the reason. One author states, "Second, [speech codes] are linked to a broader ideological agenda designed to foster an egalitarian vision of social justice". Because many institutions hold such a view in their mission statements, the justification for a policy in line with the views of the institution comes quite naturally. However, opponents of speech codes often maintain that any restriction on speech is a violation of the First Amendment. Because words and phrases typically belonging in the hate speech category could also be used in literature, quoted for socially acceptable purposes or used out loud as examples of what not to say in certain situations, it can be argued that the words and phrases have practical, intrinsic value and therefore should not be banned.

== Criticisms of Speech Codes ==
According to one scholar, hate speech complaints are up on campuses everywhere, pressuring universities to create speech codes of their own. He states:

There were approximately 75 hate speech codes in place at U.S. colleges and universities in 1990; by 1991, the number grew to over 300. School administrators institute codes primarily to foster productive learning environments in the face of rising racially motivated and other offensive incidents on many campuses. According to a recent study, reports of campus harassment increased 400 percent between 1985 and 1990. Moreover, 80 percent of campus harassment incidents go unreported.

Critics of speech codes such as the Foundation for Individual Rights in Education (FIRE) allege that speech codes are often not enforced impartially, but serve as a form of unconstitutional viewpoint discrimination, punishing those "whose speech does not meet their subjective standards of 'political correctness'", and feel that "Progress [towards free speech rights] is endangered when schools attempt to use a charge of disruption as a pretext for censoring speech." Many who argue against speech codes cite former Supreme Court justice Oliver Wendell Holmes Jr., believing that "The very aim and end of our institutions is just this: that we may think what we like and say what we think."

As of 2021, 21.3% of 478 schools surveyed by the Foundation for Individual Rights in Education maintain at least one policy that is considered to substantially restrict freedom of speech. This number is slowly declining however, with 2021 being the thirteenth year in a row that the percentage of schools holding such policies has decreased. On the other end of it, the number of universities that are committed to protecting free speech continues to go up, with 76 universities committing to this belief by 2021.

== See also ==
- Anti-bias curriculum
- Inclusive language
- First Amendment Center
- Foundation for Individual Rights in Education
- Political correctness
- Urofsky v. Gilmore

== Bibliography ==
- Strossen, Nadine (1990). "Regulating Racist Speech on Campus: A Modest Proposal?". Duke Law Journal. 1990 (3): 484–573. doi:10.2307/1372555. JSTOR 1372555.
- Strossen, Nadine (2017). Written testimony on Challenges to the Freedom of Speech on College Campuses.
