= Doreen Kimura =

Canadian psychologist (1933–2013)

Doreen Kimura FRSC
- Born: Doreen Goebel; February 15, 1933; Winnipeg, Manitoba
- Died: February 27, 2013 (aged 80); Vancouver, British Columbia
- Citizenship: Canadian
- Education: McGill University
- Children: 1
- Awards: Donald O. Hebb Award for Distinguished Contributions to Canadian Psychology as a Science
- Scientific career
- Fields: Neuropsychology
- Workplaces: University of Western Ontario; Simon Fraser University
- Thesis: Visual and auditory perception after temporal-lobe damage (1961)
- Doctoral advisor: Brenda Milner
- Other academic advisors: Woodburn Heron
- Doctoral students: Liisa Galea

Doreen Kimura FRSC (February 15, 1933 – February 27, 2013) was a Canadian psychologist who was professor at the University of Western Ontario. Kimura was recognized for her contributions to the field of neuropsychology and later, her advocacy for academic freedom. She was the founding president of the Society for Academic Freedom and Scholarship.

== Biography ==
Kimura was born in Winnipeg, Manitoba, and grew up in the village of Neudorf, Saskatchewan. Kimura was finishing her final year of high school via correspondence while teaching in a one-room schoolhouse in Northern Manitoba when she applied to and won an entrance scholarship to McGill University in Montreal.

Kimura went on to earn bachelor's, master's, and doctoral (in 1961) degrees from McGill. Woodburn Heron supervised her master's thesis. She conducted her doctoral research at the Montreal Neurological Institute under the supervision of neuroscientist Brenda Milner (co-supervised by Donald O. Hebb).

Kimura joined the faculty at the University of Western Ontario in London, Ontario, in 1967, and remained there for the rest of her career. In 1974, she established the Neuropsychology Unit at London's University Hospital (now London Health Sciences Centre).

She had one daughter, named Charlotte Thistle Archer. Kimura died on February 27, 2013, at age 80, in Vancouver.

== Work ==
Kimura's early work, starting in the 1960s, assessed differences in the language and music processing capabilities of the two hemispheres of the brain. She demonstrated that right-handed subjects have a right-ear superiority for the reception of words and numbers, and left-ear superiority for the perception of melodies; she concluded that these superiorities must reflect the processing specializations of the left and right hemispheres of the brain. Kimura was among the first researchers to use dichotic listening tests in her work, a non-invasive method for studying the lateral asymmetry of auditory processing in the brain.

Kimura studied healthy individuals, as well as patients with apraxia and aphasia, to draw conclusions about the neurological underpinnings of communication. Her 1993 monograph, Neuromotor Mechanisms in Human Communication, summarized her research in this area over the prior two decades.

Kimura's later interests included the relationship between sex and cognition and promoting academic freedom. In a number of publications, including her 2000 book Sex and Cognition, she suggested that cognitive and behavioural differences between males and females can be attributed to the influence of sex hormones on brain development. This work has been met with criticism by those who assert that gender differences are better explained by the influences of society and culture. In a special issue of the journal Canadian Psychology, Kimura argued against affirmative action for women in academia, calling it "demeaning" to women.

== Awards and honours ==
- 1985: Award for Distinguished Contributions to Canadian Psychology as a Science, Canadian Psychological Association
- 2000: Nora and Ted Sterling Prize in Support of Controversy, Simon Fraser University
- 2005: Donald O. Hebb Distinguished Contribution Award, Canadian Society for Brain, Behaviour, and Cognitive Science
- 2006: Kistler Prize, Foundation for the Future

== Books ==
- Neuromotor mechanisms in human communication (1993), Oxford: OUP ISBN 0-19-505492-X
- Sex and Cognition (2000), Cambridge, MA: MIT Press ISBN 0-262-61164-3
