= C. Davison Ankney =

Canadian zoologist (1946–2013)

- Born: Claude Davison Ankney; 1946; Cleveland, Ohio, United States
- Died: February 28, 2013 (aged 66–67); Long Point, Ontario, Canada
- Education: University of Western Ontario
- Known for: Work on life cycles of waterfowl
- Scientific career
- Fields: Zoology; Ecology
- Workplaces: University of Western Ontario
- Thesis: The importance of nutrient reserves to breeding blue geese, Anser Caerulescens (1974)

Claude Davison "Dave" Ankney (1946 – February 28, 2013) was an American-Canadian zoologist, ornithologist, and conservationist. He was a professor of zoology at the University of Western Ontario, where his research focused on avian reproductive biology, population ecology, and the role of nutrient reserves in waterfowl reproduction. His research on snow geese helped establish the importance of stored energy reserves in determining reproductive success in birds.

== Early life and education ==
Ankney was born in Cleveland, Ohio, in 1946, and raised in Michigan. His interest in wildlife biology developed through his early experiences with waterfowl and hunting.

Ankney earned a Bachelor of Science degree from Michigan State University in 1968, where he studied under wildlife biologist Miles D. Pirnie. He subsequently undertook graduate studies at Iowa State University under Milton Weller before transferring to the University of Western Ontario, where he completed his PhD in zoology in 1974 under the supervision of Charles MacInnes. His doctoral research examined the importance of nutrient reserves in the breeding biology of lesser snow geese.

== Academic career and research ==
Following the completion of his doctorate in 1974, Ankney joined the University of Western Ontario as an assistant professor of zoology. He pursued research in avian reproductive biology and population ecology, particularly the role of nutrient reserves in the life-history strategies of waterfowl. He attained the rank of Distinguished Research Professor at the University of Western Ontario before retiring..

=== Waterfowl reproductive biology ===
Ankney's research examined how nutrient reserves influence reproductive performance in birds. In a 1978 study coauthored with Charles D. MacInnes, he investigated the relationship between fat and protein reserves and breeding success in female lesser snow geese. The researchers found that females with greater nutrient reserves tended to produce larger clutches and that sufficient remaining reserves were important for survival during incubation.

The 1978 study influenced subsequent research into nutrient dynamics and avian reproductive strategies and was recognized as a Citation Classic in 1992.

=== Population ecology ===
Ankney also studied the population dynamics and conservation of North American waterfowl, including American black ducks, mallards, and snow geese. His research addressed competition and hybridization between black ducks and mallards, as well as the ecological and management implications of increasing snow goose populations.

== Conservation work ==
=== Wild turkey reintroduction in Ontario ===
Ankney played a role in efforts to reintroduce wild turkeys to Ontario after the species had disappeared from the province in the early twentieth century. Alongside fellow conservationist Joel Hopkins, he advocated for the restoration of wild turkey populations and helped build support for the initiative among wildlife conservation organizations, including the Ontario Federation of Anglers and Hunters.

The provincial reintroduction program began in 1984, with wild turkeys transferred from established populations in the United States. The program subsequently expanded across southern Ontario, contributing to the restoration of a self-sustaining wild turkey population in the province.

=== Conservation organizations ===
Ankney held several leadership and advisory positions in wildlife conservation organizations. He served as president and director-at-large of the Ontario Federation of Anglers and Hunters, director of the Canadian Wildlife Federation, and founding director and president of the Ontario Wildlife Foundation.

He was also an early scientific advisor to Long Point Waterfowl, a waterfowl research and conservation organization established in 1989. The organization developed a research partnership with the University of Western Ontario, involving collaborative scientific publications and graduate student research.

== Awards ==
Ankney received several awards recognizing his contributions to ornithological research and wildlife conservation, including:

- 1997 – Ducks Unlimited Conservation Achievement Award.
- 1999 – Ontario Federation of Anglers and Hunters Professional Conservation Award.
- 1999 – Ontario Latornell Conservation Award.

== Legacy ==
Ankney's contributions to ornithology and wildlife conservation were commemorated through research scholarships established in his name. Following his death in 2013, Long Point Waterfowl established the Dave Ankney and Sandi Johnson Graduate Research Scholarships to support graduate students conducting waterfowl research in North America.

The Ontario Federation of Anglers and Hunters also established the OFAH/Dr. Dave Ankney/Sandi Johnson Award for Avian Ecology in his memory. Announced in 2013, the annual award provided $2,000 to support graduate research in avian ecology.
