= Keith Whittington =

American political scientist

- Born: July 12, 1968 (age 58)
- Occupations: Professor, academic

Academic background
- Education: University of Texas at Austin (BA); Yale University (MA, PhD)

Academic work
- Discipline: Political science
- Institutions: Catholic University of America; Princeton University; Yale University

Keith E. Whittington (born July 12, 1968) is an American political scientist and legal scholar. In July 2024, he joined the Yale Law School faculty as the David Boies Professor of Law, having previously served as the William Nelson Cromwell Professor of Politics at Princeton University, where he continues as professor emeritus. Whittington's research focuses on American constitutionalism, American political and constitutional history, judicial politics, the presidency, and free speech and the law.

== Early life and education ==
He graduated with a bachelor's degree in government, finance and honors business at the University of Texas at Austin. He received a master's degree in political science at Yale University, followed by a doctoral degree in 1995.

== Academia ==
Whittington's work has contributed to increased understanding of originalist thought, political construction of constitutional principles, and the history of political conflict over constitutional meaning.

His professorial career began in 1995, with an assistant professorship at the Catholic University of America. He joined the Princeton University faculty in 1997, and he became the William Nelson Cromwell Professor of Politics in 2006, a professorship endowed for the study of law. He has been a visiting professor at Harvard Law School, the Georgetown University Law Center, and the University of Texas School of Law.

Whittington was elected a fellow of the American Academy of Arts and Sciences in 2012. He is a visiting fellow at the Hoover Institution.

== Other professional activities ==
He was the founding chair of the Academic Freedom Alliance and serves on its academic committee.

In 2021, Whittington was appointed to the Presidential Commission on the Supreme Court of the United States.

He is a blogger at the Volokh Conspiracy and has had works in various media outlets, like The New York Times and The Washington Post.

== Authored books ==
- Whittington, Keith; Gillman, Howard; Mark A., Graber (2021). American Constitutionalism (3rd ed.). Oxford: Oxford University Press. ISBN 978-0-19-752763-4.
- ———————— (2019). Repugnant Laws: Judicial Review of Acts of Congress from the Founding to the Present. Lawrence: University Press of Kansas. ISBN 978-0-7006-2779-0.
- ———————— (2018). Speak Freely: Why Universities Must Defend Free Speech. Princeton: Princeton University Press. ISBN 9780691181608.
- ———————— (2016). American Political Thought: Readings and Materials. Oxford: Oxford University Press. ISBN 978-0-19-933886-3.
- ———————— (2007). Political Foundations of Judicial Supremacy: The Presidency, the Supreme Court, and Constitutional Leadership in U.S. History. Princeton University Press. ISBN 978-0-691-09640-7.
- ———————— (1999). Constitutional Interpretation: Textual Meaning, Original Intent, and Judicial Review. University Press of Kansas. ISBN 978-0-7006-1141-6.
- ———————— (1999). Constitutional Construction: Divided Powers and Constitutional Meaning. Cambridge: Harvard University Press. ISBN 978-0-674-16541-0.
