= Harvey Silverglate =

Attorney and political advocate

- Born: May 10, 1942 (age 84); New York City, U.S.
- Education: Princeton University (BA); Harvard University (JD)
- Occupation: Attorney
- Organization: Foundation for Individual Rights and Expression (FIRE)
- Spouse: Elsa Dorfman (m. 1976; died 2020)
- Website: harveysilverglate.com

Harvey Allen Silverglate (born May 10, 1942) is a retired American attorney, journalist, writer, and a co-founder of the Foundation for Individual Rights and Expression (FIRE).

Silverglate was a member of the board of the Massachusetts chapter of the American Civil Liberties Union and also taught at Harvard Law School, the University of Massachusetts Boston, and at the Cambridge Rindge and Latin School.

He was an attorney in Cambridge, Massachusetts. He practiced in academic freedom, civil liberties, criminal defense, and students' rights cases. He also co-founded FIRE with Alan Charles Kors.

== Early life and education ==
Born in New York City, Silverglate graduated from Bogota High School in Bogota, New Jersey, in 1960. He then graduated from Princeton University with a B.A., cum laude, in 1964, and earned his J.D. from Harvard Law School in 1967. He is a practicing attorney, specializing in civil liberties litigation, criminal defense, academic freedom, and students' rights cases. He was in the role of Of Counsel to the Boston-based law firm Zalkind Duncan & Bernstein.

Among his more prominent clients was John Eastman, a fellow attorney controversial for his service to Donald Trump.

== Career ==
In addition to his law practice, Silverglate is also a journalist and writer. He was a columnist for the Boston Phoenix, writing on politics, law, and civil liberties. He also wrote a regular column for Forbes.com, and has written columns and op-eds for the Wall Street Journal, the Boston Globe, the Los Angeles Times, the National Law Journal, Reason magazine, Massachusetts Lawyers Weekly, and other publications. He authored two books, The Shadow University: The Betrayal of Liberty on America's Campuses (co-authored with Alan Charles Kors) and Three Felonies a Day, which details the extension of vague federal criminal laws into daily conduct that would not be readily seen as criminal.

Silverglate was a featured speaker at a rally by Demand Progress in memory of Aaron Swartz and wrote an op-ed for Massachusetts Lawyers Weekly about Swartz's prosecution by the U.S. Attorney's Office. Lawyers familiar with the case told him the Middlesex County District Attorney's plan had been to resolve Swartz's case by having it "...continued without a finding, with Swartz duly admonished and then returned to civil society to continue his pioneering electronic work in a less legally questionable manner." As he explained to CNET's Declan McCullagh:

Under such a disposition, the charge is held in abeyance ("continued") without any verdict ("without a finding"). The defendant is on probation for a period of a few months up to maybe a couple of years at the most; if the defendant does not get into further legal trouble, the charge is dismissed, and the defendant has no criminal record. This is what the lawyers expected to happen when Swartz was arrested.

"Tragedy intervened", Silverglate wrote in Massachusetts Lawyers Weekly, "when [United States Attorney Carmen] Ortiz's office took over the case to 'send a message".

Harvey sat on the board of visitors at Ralston College, a new liberal arts college in Savannah, Georgia. Harvey publicly broke with the college and resigned from the board, decrying the unaccredited college as "antithetical to the whole concept of a liberal arts institution."

At the start of 2026, Harvey's website said that he now is a "retired attorney, writer, and non-profit activist."

=== 2009 Harvard Board of Overseers election ===
Silverglate was a candidate in the 2009 Harvard Board of Overseers elections. After collecting 315 signatures from Harvard alumni, he was nominated as a petition candidate in early February 2009. His platform focused on reforming the student disciplinary board, eliminating speech codes, and restoring the student voice in university outreach efforts. His campaign had been covered in The Boston Globe and the Harvard Law Record, and he made an appearance on Greater Boston with Emily Rooney. Election results were announced at commencement, June 4, 2009, and Silverglate finished in eighth place, with 11,700 votes, 1,600 short of winning a seat.

== Personal life ==
Silverglate was married to the portrait photographer Elsa Dorfman, who died on May 30, 2020. Their son Isaac lives in New York City.

== Books ==
- Silverglate, Harvey A. (September 2009). Three Felonies a Day: How the Feds Target the Innocent. New York: Encounter Books. ISBN 978-1594032554. OL 23165254M.
- The Shadow University: The Betrayal Of Liberty On America's Campuses by Alan Charles Kors (Author) and Harvey A. Silverglate (Author) ISBN 0-06-097772-8 (1999).
- Conviction Machine: Standing Up to Federal Prosecutorial Abuse by Sidney Powell and Harvey A. Silverglate (2019).

== See also ==
- Nothing to hide argument
