= Debra Mashek =

American nonprofit executive

Debra Mashek is an American nonprofit executive. She is a former professor of psychology at Harvey Mudd College.

Mashek graduated from Nebraska Wesleyan University in 1997 with a BS in psychology and biology. She received an MA in 1999 and PhD in 2002 in social and health psychology with an emphasis in quantitative methods from Stony Brook University.

In 2018, Mashek was appointed as the executive director of Heterodox Academy, a position which she held until 2020, after which an interim executive director was appointed.

In 2023, Mashek published the book Collabor(h)ate: How to build incredible collaborative relationships at work (even if you’d rather work alone).
