= Long Point Waterfowl =

Long Point Waterfowl and Wetlands Research Program
- Formation: 1980s
- Headquarters: Port Rowan, Ontario
- Region served: Lower Great Lakes
- Parent organization: Birds Canada
- Website: birdscanada.org
- Formerly called: Long Point Waterfowl and Wetland Research Fund

The Long Point Waterfowl and Wetlands Research Program, known for much of its history as Long Point Waterfowl (LPW), is a Canadian research program that studies waterfowl, other wetland birds and their habitats in the lower Great Lakes. It takes its name from Long Point, a sand spit on the north shore of Lake Erie that is a major staging area for migrating waterfowl.

Begun in the 1980s as a research fund backed by a private hunting club and the federal government, it was run for much of its history by Bird Studies Canada. It briefly moved toward independence in 2015 and is today a program of Birds Canada, based in Port Rowan.

== History ==
=== Origins ===
The program grew out of the Long Point Waterfowl and Wetland Research Fund, established in the 1980s through an agreement between the Bluffs Club, a hunting club on Long Point, and Environment Canada. Its purpose was to develop scientific knowledge about waterfowl and wetlands in the Long Point region. Bird Studies Canada became a party to the agreement several years after it was signed.

Accounts of the program's founding date vary. An organizational history published in 2015 places its origins in the mid-1980s, while Western University, an early academic partner, dates its establishment to 1989.

=== Under Bird Studies Canada (c. 1990–2015) ===
For approximately 25 years, Long Point Waterfowl operated under the administration of Bird Studies Canada. Bird Studies Canada managed the program's finances and administration, employed its staff, and retained oversight through its board of directors. A separate Long Point Waterfowl board provided direction on program policy.

Wildlife biologist Scott Petrie was appointed executive director in 1997 and led the organization for 18 years.

During his tenure, Long Point Waterfowl strengthened its relationship with Western University. Petrie held an adjunct academic appointment, supervised student research, and taught the university's undergraduate course in wildlife ecology and management.

Petrie was also a director-at-large of the Ontario Federation of Anglers and Hunters, which recognized him with its Jack O'Dette Conservation Leadership Award in 2014.

=== Attempted independence (2014–2015) ===
In November 2014, the Bird Studies Canada board decided to end its administrative arrangement with Long Point Waterfowl, concluding that the program had grown sufficiently to operate independently.

Long Point Waterfowl subsequently incorporated, began seeking charitable registration with the Canada Revenue Agency, and planned to relocate its headquarters to its research and education centre near Turkey Point. Bird Studies Canada was expected to continue providing administrative support until the end of 2015.

Petrie departed during the transition. Ted Barney, a biologist who had worked with Long Point Waterfowl since 2006 and served as assistant director, assumed responsibility for operations in May 2015.

In September 2015, Petrie became chief executive officer and chief scientist of Delta Waterfowl.

=== Return to Bird Studies Canada ===
By 2018, scientific publications by Long Point Waterfowl researchers identified their affiliation as the Long Point Waterfowl and Wetlands Research Program of Bird Studies Canada.

A 2019 technical report described the program as encompassing Bird Studies Canada's waterfowl and wetland research activities in the lower Great Lakes region.

The program continues to operate through Birds Canada, the successor name of Bird Studies Canada.

== Research ==
Long Point Waterfowl conducts applied research intended to inform the conservation and management of waterfowl and wetland ecosystems. Its work addresses scientific questions relevant to wildlife agencies, conservation organizations, and wetland managers.

Research projects have included investigations of the survival and habitat selection of wood duck ducklings, as well as studies examining the effects of managed water-level reductions on wetland birds in the Montezuma Wetlands Complex in New York State.

Birds Canada has reported that research conducted through the program has contributed to recommendations supporting the restoration and management of Great Lakes coastal wetlands.

== Training ==
Education and scientific training have been part of Long Point Waterfowl's activities since its establishment.

By 2014, 11 master's students and two doctoral students had completed degrees through research associated with the program. Eighteen undergraduate honours students had completed research projects with its staff, while several hundred Western University undergraduates had participated in field training. Collaborations with Western University's Department of Biology had produced more than 50 peer-reviewed scientific publications by that time.

Long Point Waterfowl also operated a youth hunting and conservation course designed to introduce participants to wildlife management and conservation practices.

== See also ==
- Birds Canada
- Long Point Bird Observatory
- Long Point National Wildlife Area
- Delta Waterfowl Foundation
