= G. Lynn Nelson =

American writer (1937–2014)

- Occupations: Author, academic
- Employer: Arizona State University
- Known for: Young adult writing programs, alternative language study approaches
- Notable work: Writing and Being: Embracing Life Through Creative Journaling

G. Lynn Nelson was an American author and academic notable for his advocacy of young adult writing programs and the implementation of alternative approaches to language study informed by Native American concepts. Nelson began teaching at Arizona State University in 1973 and served as the director of the regional Greater Phoenix Area Writing Project (GPAWP), a regional site of the National Writing Project (NWP), until 2004. He co-founded the Young Adult Writing Project (YAWP) in 1996. Nelson died November 6, 2014.

== Writing and Being ==
Published in 2004, Nelson's book Writing and Being: Embracing Life Through Creative Journaling offers an alternative to traditional methods of writing instruction found in schools. (The first edition of the text carried a different subtitle: Taking Back Our Lives Through the Power of Language.)

Nelson said that "too often in school, we study language and writing in isolation, apart from the people who speak and write and apart from what happens when people speak and write — apart from our being" (xii). Meaningful writing, he argues, should go beyond a "grade [and] critical analysis and correctness" in order "to tell your own stories, to heal your wounds, to find a bit of peace and love" (xii). Nelson's approach relies heavily on private journaling, in which writers begin by exploring their inner lives without fear of restriction or criticism (3–8).

== The Feather Circle ==
Students following Nelson's approach move selected writing from development in a journal through a process of drafting until the work is ready to be made "public." This takes place in the form of a publishing circle (or "Feather Circle"), in which students read their work aloud and offer praise and support to one another. Nelson outlines a series of guidelines intended to build a shared sense of community and trust through this process. He attributes the Feather Circle concept to Native American talking circles.

== Controversy ==
In 2005, the Foundation for Individual Rights in Education (FIRE), a civil rights group, drew attention to Nelson's Arizona State University website course descriptions, which included sections of First Year Composition courses intended "For Native American students only." Nelson was forced by the university to discontinue these sections.

Nelson did not view his classes as discriminatory, explaining that his experiences working with Native American students suggested that they might benefit from a class which "focused on their own experiences." There had been cases when non-Native Americans had enrolled in such courses, and Nelson did not oppose this.
