= Academic Freedom Alliance =

American nonprofit organization

- Formation: March 2021; 5 years ago
- Type: 501(c)(3) organization
- Tax ID no.: 85-3780742
- Website: academicfreedom.org

The Academic Freedom Alliance (AFA) is a nonprofit organization formed by college educators to defend free expression. The mission of the organization is to challenge university administrations and provide legal help to professors who face disciplinary action over controversial speech or activities. It was founded by Keith Whittington, Cornel West, Robert George, Jeannie Suk Gersen, and Nadine Strossen.

== Overview ==
The organization provides legal support for professors involved in free speech controversies. It challenges university administrations and external entities on behalf of the academicians to support academic freedom and civil debate on a range of issues. Its actions have defended multiple professors including preventing a professor from getting fired from a university.

== History ==
The Academic Freedom Alliance was founded in March 2021 by a group of Princeton University faculty along with 200 other founding members in the United States.

In March 2022, the Academic Freedom Alliance sent a letter to the administration of Princeton University calling on it to remove criticism of a faculty member's speech from the webpage of the Carl Fields Center for Equality and Cultural Understanding. Writing for the Academe Blog of the American Association of University Professors, John K. Wilson stated that advocating for such restrictions on criticism of faculty by university staff and centers on all university webpages represents an "untenable" and "hypocritical standard" that would lead to "censorship on a breathtaking scale." Princeton President Christopher L. Eisgruber declined to remove the controversial comment from the webpage of Carl Fields Center for Equality and Cultural Understanding.
