= Alan Charles Kors =

American academic

- Born: July 18, 1943 (age 83); United States
- Education: Princeton University (BA); Harvard University (MA, PhD)
- Occupation: Professor

Alan Charles Kors (born July 18, 1943) is an American historian who is the Henry Charles Lea Professor Emeritus of History at the University of Pennsylvania, where he taught the intellectual history of the 17th and 18th centuries. He has received both the Lindback Foundation Award and the Ira Abrams Memorial Award for distinguished college teaching.

== Early life and education ==
Kors was born on July 18, 1943, and graduated with a Bachelor of Arts, summa cum laude, from Princeton University in 1964, and received a M.A. (1965) and Ph.D. (1968) in European history from Harvard University.

== Career ==
Kors has written on the history of skeptical, atheistic, and materialist thought in 17th and 18th-century France, on the Enlightenment in general, on the history of European witchcraft beliefs, and on academic freedom. He was also the Editor-in-Chief of the Encyclopedia of the Enlightenment, which was published in four volumes by Oxford University Press in 2002. Kors co-founded – with civil rights advocate Harvey Silverglate and served, from 2000 to 2006, as chairman of the board of directors of the Foundation for Individual Rights and Expression (FIRE). He has occasionally written pieces for popular libertarian journals on political matters such as Reason. His essay "Can There Be An After Socialism?" was published by the journal Social Philosophy & Policy. He has served on the boards of The Historical Society and the American Society for Eighteenth-Century Studies.

== Books ==
- The Shadow University: The Betrayal Of Liberty On America's Campuses by Alan Charles Kors (Author), Harvey A. Silverglate (Author) ISBN 0-06-097772-8 (1999)
- The birth of the modern mind: an intellectual history of the 17th and 18th century, two parts. The Teaching Company. 1999.
- Witchcraft in Europe, 400–1700: A Documentary History (Middle Ages Series) by Alan Charles Kors (Editor), Edward Peters (Editor) ISBN 0-8122-1751-9 (1972, revised edition 2001)
- Encyclopedia of the Enlightenment (4 vol. set) by Alan Charles Kors (Editor) ISBN 0-19-510433-1 (2002)
- Voltaire and the triumph of the Englightenment. The Teaching Compoany. 2008.
- D'Holbach's Coterie: An Enlightenment in Paris by Alan Charles Kors (Author) ISBN 0-691-05224-7 (1976, reissued 2015)
- Atheism in France, 1650–1729: The Orthodox Sources of Disbelief by Alan Charles Kors (Author) ISBN 0-691-05575-0 (1990, reissued 2015)
- Naturalism and Unbelief in France, 1650-1729 by Alan Charles Kors (Author) ISBN 978-1107106635 (2016)
- Epicureans and Atheists in France, 1650-1729 by Alan Charles Kors (Author) ISBN 978-1107132641 (2016)
