= Network for Education and Academic Rights =

Network For Education and Academic Rights (NEAR) was founded as a membership-based, non-governmental organisation to promote and protect academic freedom and academic rights. NEAR facilitated international collaboration between organisations and individuals active in issues of academic freedom and education rights, and seeks to defend the human rights of those in the higher education sector, including academics, researchers and students. NEAR was launched at the UNESCO offices in Paris in June 2001. NEAR disbanded, with some of its work being continued to Scholars at Risk.

NEAR received reports of academic freedom violations from its members or credible media sources, and works to increase awareness and response through its emergency action alert system, bulletins and media outreach. NEAR also worked with academics and activists worldwide active on issues of academic freedom and academic rights to encourage joint action and build capacity through its series of international workshops. NEAR members included Amnesty International, the American Association for the Advancement of Science, the AAUP, Article 19, the ACU, CODESRIA, Education International, Index on Censorship, IAU, International PEN, Human Rights Watch, the National Academy of Sciences, UCU, World University Service, Scholars at Risk, Council for Assisting Refugee Academics, the African Academic Freedom Network and the Arab Society for Academic Freedom. NEAR was initially hosted by the Council for Assisting Refugee Academics in London. Professor John Akker was named executive director.
