= Ontario Federation of Anglers and Hunters =

The Ontario Federation of Anglers and Hunters (OFAH) was established in 1928, and is Canada's leading conservation organization, as well as a non-profit registered charity. The Federation lobbies for the protection of wildlife and Canadian outdoor traditions. As of 2007, it has 82,000 members, and 655 membership clubs.

The OFAH is notable in that it opposes the Canadian Firearms Registry, and launched a lawsuit against the Ontario Liberal government in order to have the spring bear hunt reinstated. The OFAH was successful in having the section of the Lord's Day Act repealed which banned Sunday gun hunting in Ontario. Lately, the OFAH has been campaigning to have the cormorant population in Ontario controlled.
