= Academic freedom =

Moral and legal concept

Worldwide state of academic freedom according to the Academic Freedom Index

Academic freedom is the right of a teacher to instruct and the right of a student to learn in an academic setting unhampered by interference. It may also include the right of academics to engage in social and political criticism.

Academic freedom is often premised on the conviction that freedom of inquiry by faculty members is essential to the mission of the academy as well as the principles of academia, and that scholars should have freedom to teach or communicate ideas or facts (including those that are inconvenient to external political groups or to authorities) without the fear of being repressed, losing their job or being imprisoned. While the core of academic freedom covers scholars acting in an academic capacity (as teachers or researchers expressing strictly scholarly viewpoints), an expansive interpretation extends these occupational safeguards to scholars' speech on matters outside their professional expertise.

Academic tenure protects academic freedom by ensuring that teachers can be fired only for causes such as gross professional incompetence or behavior that evokes condemnation from the academic community itself. The academic community pressuring scholars can reduce academic freedom.

Historically, academic freedom emerged tentatively, as academics in medieval and early modern Europe could face repression for acting in ways considered objectionable by religious authorities or by governments. Scholars tend to link the institutionalization of academic freedom to the rise of the modern research university and the Humboldtian model of higher education from the 19th century. By one estimate, academic freedom has substantially increased worldwide since the 1960s. Academic freedom is more likely in liberal democratic states, while it is more heavily constrained in authoritarian states, illiberal states, and states embroiled in military conflict. Since 2013, while some countries have seen improvements to academic freedom, the overall trend is towards reductions in freedom.

== Definition ==
A minimal definition of academic freedom is that a teacher has a right to instruct, and a student has a right to learn in an academic setting unhampered by interference. Other definitions include the right of teachers to engage in social and political criticism.

A broader definition of academic freedom incorporates individual, extramural and institutional components. Under this broader definition, an academic has freedom of expression without government interference, but this freedom is circumscribed by academic expertise and position. Academic freedom of speech is therefore narrower than a general freedom of speech. For example, a non-academic has the freedom of speech to criticize the efficacy of vaccines, but only has academic freedom to do so if they possess the prerequisite academic qualifications to do so. Unlike public speech, academic speech is also subject to quality controls by academic peers, for example through peer review.

Universities UK has defined academic freedom as "protecting the intellectual independence of academics to question and test received views and wisdom, and to put forward new ideas and controversial or unpopular opinions, without placing themselves in danger of losing their jobs or privileges", while the American Federation of Teachers has seen it as "based on the idea that the free exchange of ideas on campus is essential to good education". Norwegian education sees it as a guarantee that research and teaching is "intellectually and morally independent of all political and economic interests", leading to openness, free enquiry and debate.

The laissez-faire approach of unaccountable academic freedom is contrasted with democratic accountability of academia.

== Historical background ==
Historically, academic freedom emerged tentatively. However, Richard Hofstadter and Walter Metzger contend that academic freedom is "a modern term for an ancient idea" and "can be traced at least as far back as Socrates' eloquent defense of himself in 399 B.C. against the charge of corrupting the youth of Athens."

In 1155, the Holy Roman Emperor Frederick I Barbarossa issued the document Authentica habita which laid out rights and privileges of students and scholars, which included immunity from civil jurisdiction and freedom of movement for the purposes of studying and teaching. Similarly, civil disturbances, such as the St Scholastica Day riot of 1355 at the University of Oxford often led to great autonomy for universities. And even those scholars who committed theological heresy, such as John Wyclif and Jan Hus, has support due to their roles as faculty at a university.

=== 19th century ===
The Humboldtian model of higher education from the 19th century enshrined the basic ideas of academic freedom and diffused them to other countries. Wilhelm von Humboldt was a philosopher and linguist who was given the authority to create a new university in Berlin in the early 19th century. In founding the Humboldt University of Berlin he created a university that adhered to two principles of academic freedom: freedom of scientific inquiry and the unity between research and teaching. According to Humboldt, the fundamental proposition underlying the principles of academic freedom was to uphold the view that science is not something that has already been found but as knowledge that will never be fully discovered and, yet, needs to be searched for unceasingly. The university he founded later became a model and inspiration for modern colleges in Germany and universities in the West.

During this period there was also a sense that universities must be insulated from the pressures of donors, boards of trustees and state governments. One notable instance was the case of the resignation of Brown University president Elisha Andrews, who advocated silver coinage to reduce the impact on Americans and farmers who owed larger and larger loans due to deflation. The board of Brown University, many of whom were creditors and landowners and benefited from deflation, told Andrews to cease his public advocacy. The dean of Yale Law School, Francis Wayland, argued that Andrews' free expression threatened donations to Brown, and that money was the life blood of universities. In 1897, Andrews was forced to offer his resignation, but there was a backlash by faculty and students who advocated that he should be protected under the principles of free speech. The board reversed its decision and refused Andrews' resignation. A year later, Andrews resigned anyway.

=== 20th century ===
The concept of academic freedom was also formulated in response to the encroachments of the totalitarian state on science and academia in general for the furtherance of its own goals. For instance, in the Soviet Union, scientific research was brought under strict political control in the 1930s. A number of research areas were declared "bourgeois pseudoscience" and forbidden, notably genetics (see "Lysenkoism") and sociology. Marxist scientist John Desmond Bernal characterized this as part of the interdependence between "applied science" and "pure science".

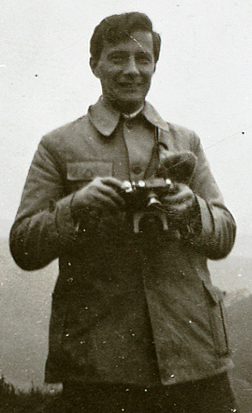
Michael Polanyi argued that academic freedom was a fundamental necessity for the production of true knowledge.

Michael Polanyi argued that a structure of liberty is essential for the advancement of science. In 1936, as a consequence of an invitation to give lectures for the Ministry of Heavy Industry in the USSR, Polanyi met Bukharin, who told him that in socialist societies all scientific research is directed to accord with the needs of the latest five-year plan. Demands in Britain for centrally planned scientific research led Polanyi, together with John Baker, to found the Society for Freedom in Science. The society promoted a liberal conception of science as free enquiry against the instrumental view that science should exist primarily to serve the needs of society. In a series of articles, re-published in The Contempt of Freedom (1940) and The Logic of Liberty (1951), Polanyi claimed that co-operation among scientists is analogous to the way in which agents co-ordinate themselves within a free market. Just as consumers in a free market determine the value of products, science is a spontaneous order that arises as a consequence of open debate among specialists. Science can therefore only flourish when scientists have the liberty to pursue truth as an end in itself:

[S]cientists, freely making their own choice of problems and pursuing them in the light of their own personal judgment, are in fact co-operating as members of a closely knit organization.

Such self-co-ordination of independent initiatives leads to a joint result which is unpremeditated by any of those who bring it about.

Any attempt to organize the group ... under a single authority would eliminate their independent initiatives, and thus reduce their joint effectiveness to that of the single person directing them from the centre. It would, in effect, paralyse their co-operation.

== Rationale ==
Proponents of academic freedom believe that the freedom of inquiry by students and faculty members is essential to the mission of the academy. They argue that academic communities are repeatedly targeted for repression due to their ability to shape and control the flow of information. When scholars attempt to teach or communicate ideas or facts that are inconvenient to external political groups or to authorities, they may find themselves targeted for public vilification, job loss, imprisonment, or even death. For example, in North Africa, a professor of public health discovered that his country's infant mortality rate was higher than government figures indicated. He lost his job and was imprisoned.

The fate of biology in the Soviet Union is cited by Jasper Becker as a reason why society has an interest in protecting academic freedom. Also it is important to make the distinction between science and pseudoscience, on the border of this lies the case of a Soviet biologist Trofim Lysenko rejected Western science – then focused primarily on making advances in theoretical genetics, based on research with the fruit fly (Drosophila melanogaster) – and proposed an approach to farming that was based on the collectivist principles of dialectical materialism. Lysenko called this "Michurinism", but it is more commonly known today as Lysenkoism, and named after him. Lysenko's ideas appealed to the Soviet leadership, in part because of their value as propaganda, and he was ultimately made director of the Soviet Academy of Agricultural Sciences. Subsequently, Lysenko directed a purge of scientists who professed "harmful ideas", resulting in the expulsion, imprisonment, or death of hundreds of Soviet scientists. Lysenko's ideas were then implemented on collectivized farms in the Soviet Union and China. Famines that resulted partly from Lysenko's influence are believed to have killed 30 million people in China alone during the Great Leap Forward.

Sociologist Ruth Pearce argued that the concept of academic freedom exists to protect scholarship from censure by state or religious authorities or others, and not to defend intolerance. Academic freedom can be reduced through scholars pressuring other scholars and resulting self-censorship or political bias.

A large-scale empirical study, covering more than 157 countries over the 1900-2015 period, links academic freedom to the quality and quantity of patents filed in a given country. David Audretsch and colleagues estimate that academic freedom has declined over the last decade for the first time over their century-long observation period, resulting in at least 4% fewer patents filed. The study claims to be the first to link academic freedom to economic growth through an innovation channel.

Academic freedom has also been identified as a leading indicator for whether a government will become more or less democratic.

== Academic Freedom Index ==
In 2020, the V-Dem Institute partnered with Scholars at Risk to create the first index of Academic freedom. The index provides retroactive ratings for countries going back to 1900 that are also updated yearly. The index estimates academic freedom using five categories that follow the UNESCO definition:

- freedom to research and teach
- freedom of academic exchange and dissemination
- institutional autonomy
- campus integrity
- freedom of academic and cultural expression

As of 2025, academic freedom overall around the world has been in retreat since 2013. Causes cited have included authoritarianism as well as political polarization and populism.

== Country-specific ==
The concept of academic freedom as a right of faculty members is an established part of most legal systems. While in the United States the constitutional protection of academic freedom derives from the guarantee of free speech under the First Amendment, the constitutions of other countries (particularly in civil law systems) typically grant a separate right to free learning, teaching, and research.

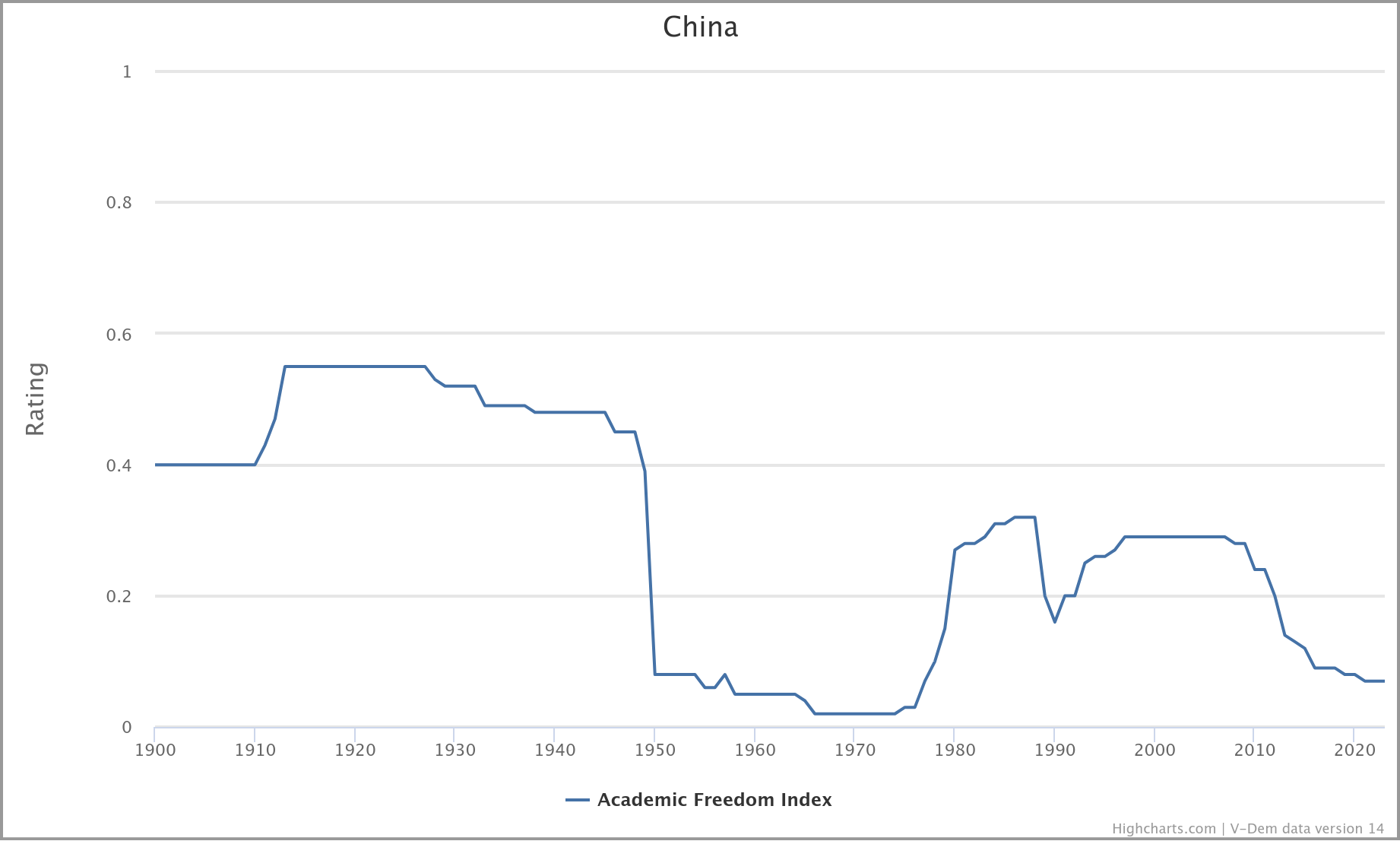
Academic freedom in China (1900–2023)

=== Australia ===
Concerns have been expressed by Freedom House and others about protections for freedom of speech and academic freedom at Australia's universities. In 2018, the Australian Government asked former Chief Justice Robert French to conduct an independent review of freedom of speech and academic freedom in Australian higher education. While French disagreed that there was a "freedom of speech crisis" on campuses, he nonetheless noted the risks to freedom posed by the various and vaguely-worded protections then in place. Concerns include the influence of the People's Republic of China on university administrations; 'deplatforming' of controversial speakers and viewpoints; and demands that academics refrain from contesting one another's conclusions.

=== Chile ===
During the late 1950s and early 1960s, students and faculty began advocating for the democratization of university life in Chile. However, after the 1973 coup, academic freedom under the Pinochet military dictatorship was repressed. Nevertheless, during the 1980s, students and faculty, with support from members of the public, collaborated to protect academic freedom.

Since the transition to democracy after the end of the Pinochet regime in 1990, academic freedom in higher education in Chile has been strong. In 2025, Chile ranked in the top ten percent of countries on the Academic Freedom Index (AFI).

=== China ===
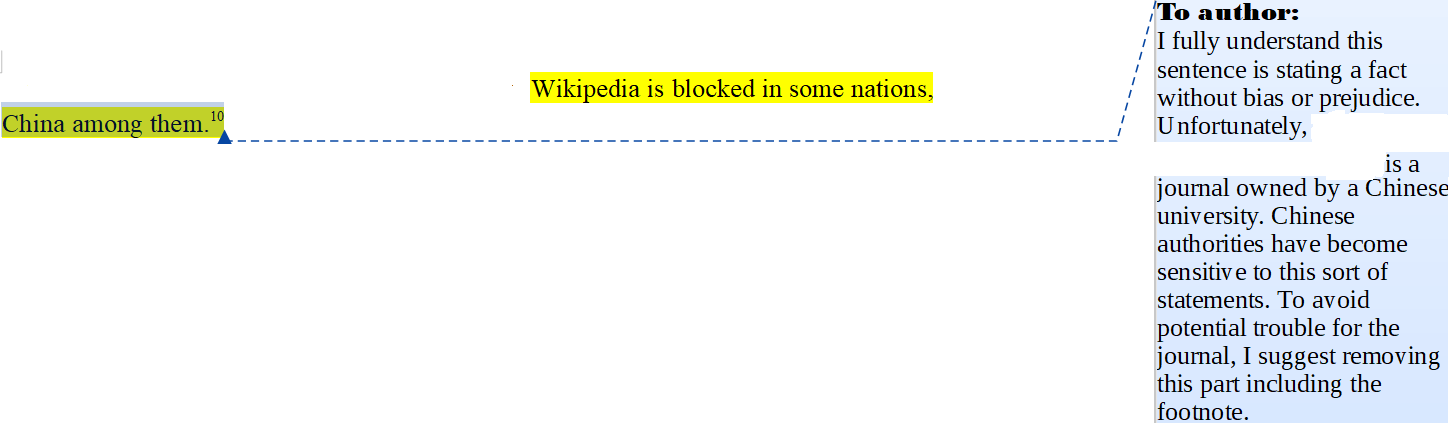
Self-censorship in a Chinese academic journal: an editor asks the article's author to remove a sentence about blocking of Wikipedia in mainland China as it could cause trouble with the "authorities".

Academic freedom is severely limited in China. Academics have noted an incentive not to express 'incorrect' opinions about issues sensitive to the Government of China and the ruling Chinese Communist Party (CCP). These efforts have been effective in causing academics to self-censor and shift academic discourse.

During the general secretaryship of Xi Jinping, universities in the country have increasingly been put under the direct management of a CCP committee secretary and have intensified ideological controls. In December 2020, the Associated Press reported that China was controlling scientific research into the origins of COVID-19 under direct orders from CCP general secretary Xi Jinping. According to the report, an order by China's State Council required all research to be approved by a task force under their management, saying scientific publication should be orchestrated like "a game of chess", warning that those who publish without permission will be held accountable.

According to National Public Radio, from 2013 to 2017, at least 109 universities in China issued their first charters affirming the CCP leadership. In 2020, Shanghai's Fudan University removed freedom of thought from its charter as part of a revision of the school charter in December 2019.

Hong Kong academia expressed concerns about the impact of the 2020 Hong Kong National Security Law on academic freedom in Hong Kong. As of 2025, it ranked in the bottom 20% worldwide for academic freedom according to the Academic Freedom Index.

In an August 2021 study, Jue Jiang from the University of London argued that academic freedom in China is impaired by the CCP's system of student informants, who are recruited and encouraged to watch and inform on their professors on university campuses.

=== Denmark ===
Danish law guarantees both institutional and individual academic freedom at universities, yet the country ranked 24th of 28 EU states in 2017 and 32nd of 179 countries in a 2024 study. Researchers and the academic union DM reported in 2024 that political pressure, insecure employment, competition for external funding and limited public awareness are weakening independence and discouraging basic research. In 2021, a political campaign against alleged “pseudo-research and activism” led to parliamentary resolution V137, with some politicians demanding interventions, lists of “dangerous” programmes and the closure of certain research fields. Over 3,000 academics signed a petition arguing the resolution threatened academic freedom and could increase self-censorship and harassment, including on social media. Earlier and ongoing controversies include the 1986 government-ordered closure of a sociology programme at Copenhagen University and recent proposals from Danish People's Party and Liberal Alliance to shut down Roskilde University for ideological reasons, including for being 'woke'.

=== Hungary ===
Central European University was forced to leave Hungary after its academic freedom deteriorated under Viktor Orbán. In 2020, students protested the overhauling by the government of the University of Theater and Film Arts.

=== India ===
As of 2025, India ranks in the bottom 10-20% of countries globally.

=== Ireland ===
Protections for academic freedom for research, teaching and other activity "to question and test received wisdom, to put forward new ideas and to state controversial or unpopular opinions" without being disadvantaged, are provided in Section 14 of the 1997 Universities Act.

=== Israel ===
Academic freedom in Israel is taken from "the Law of the Council for Higher Education". Paragraph 15 in which it states that "a recognized institution is free to all its academic and administrative matters, within the framework of its budget, as it sees fit. In this paragraph, 'academic and administrative matters' – includes: determining a research and teaching program, appointing the authorities of the institution, appointing teachers and promoting them, determining a teaching method and study, and any other scientific, educational or economic activity". It seems that the paragraph is worded in a clear and comprehensible way even for laymen. The body that is supposed to guard academic freedom, as well as maintain an adequate academic level in the higher education institutions, is the Council for Higher Education – hereinafter "The Council". This council consists of academics who serve as professors at universities, and public figures, with the Minister of Education as the head of the council.

At the disposal of "The Council" is an executive body called the "Committee for Planning and Budgeting", which mainly deals with the matter of universities budgeting and establishing relevant procedures and guidelines for budget and salary matters. Another body that is supposed to guard academic freedom is the "Committee of the Heads of the Universities", which is a voluntary body, but has an influence on the work of the Legislature and "The Council ". Through their employee committees, and through the personal activity of each of them, these bodies can try and influence the preservation of academic freedom.

In general, it can be said that the essential academic freedom, the one aimed at the freedom of teaching and research, was preserved, and the government neither interfered nor tried to interfere in these contents. Its way of influencing this matter is by providing incentives for teaching in this or that way, or for research in certain fields, and this is through grants. The fact that the government finances a significant percentage of the current budget of the universities (around 70% or more), also allows the government to decide what will be the tuition fee for a student at the budgeted universities in Israel. But, In 2021, an academic committee of the prestigious Israel Prize decided to award the Israel Prize in the field of mathematics and computer science to Professor Oded Goldreich from the Weizmann Institute of Science. The Minister of Education did not accept the committee's recommendation on the grounds that Goldreich signed a petition calling for an academic boycott of Ariel University, which is located in the territories of Judea and Samaria, which are occupied territory, as well as for appealing to the German government to revoke its decision that the BDS movement is an anti-Semitic movement. The award committee appealed to the Supreme Court for a violation of its academic freedom, and the court overturned the decision, and ordered the Minister of Education to award Goldreich the award. Godreich received the award a year later.

In recent years, a fierce debate has erupted on the issue of academic freedom, following extreme political statements by a number of university faculty members. The vast majority of the controversial statements were those that called for an academic boycott of Israel, or support for organizations that support an economic and academic boycott of Israel. The question that was at the center of the storm was whether an academic faculty member (hereafter referred to as a professor) is protected by the principle of freedom of speech, or is it forbidden, when he wears the guise of a professor, to express a political position that might identify the position with the institution he allegedly represents. All the more, is it permissible for the professor to express a political position during his teaching, and even to invite representatives of political bodies to lecture in his classes, and without maintaining a balance between those invited. (Note: As for summoning political figures to classes, it was usually professors and classes in the field of "political science, politics and government", which apparently or not, summoning these figures and the discourse accompanying their words, is part of the professor's teaching method.) Referring to that background, the Minister of Education at the time Naftali Bennett (in 2017) asked Prof. Asa Kasher to compile an academic Code of Ethics for universities, a code that was approved by "The Council" in March 2018. All the research universities (7 universities), with the exception of Ben-Gurion University of the Negev, which already had for an academic code of ethics that also included the issue of freedom of expression, refused to adopt this code on the grounds of infringing academic freedom.

All research universities in Israel have a Chief internal auditor, relatively independent. This issue of the interrelationship between the internal audit in universities and the principle of academic freedom is discussed in detail in an article that appeared in a book issued on behalf of the Ben-Gurion university of the Negev – the only one as mentioned that has a binding academic code of ethics.

=== Mauritius ===
In the Chapter II Constitution of Mauritius, academics have the right to: the protection of freedom of conscience, protection of freedom of expression, protection of freedom of assembly and association, protection of freedom to establish schools and the protection from discrimination. The institutional bureaucracy and the dependence on the state for funds has restricted the freedom of academics to criticize government policy. Dr. Kasenally, an educator at the University of Mauritius stated that in 1970s to 1980s the university was at the forefront of controversial debates, but in the 1990s the university stepped away after academic freedom was curtailed to not express views or ideas especially if they oppose those of the management or government. In a 2012 paper on the University of Mauritius the author states that although there are no records of abuse of human rights or freedom of the state "subtle threats to freedom of expression do exist, especially with regard to criticisms of ruling political parties and their leaders as well as religious groups." While there have been no cases of arrests or extreme detention of academics, there has been fear that it would hinder their career progress especially at the level of a promotion thus, the academics try to avoid participating in controversial debates. Academic freedom became a public issue in May 2009 when the university spoke out against the vice chancellor Professor I. Fagoonee, who had forwarded a circular sent by the Ministry of Education to academics. This circular targeted public officers and required them to consult their superiors before speaking to the press. The pushback resulted in the vice chancellor stepping down, with the author speculating the government used the vice chancellor as the scapegoat for its unpopular proposal to try to curtail academic freedom.

=== Netherlands ===
In the Netherlands the academic freedom is limited relative to other Western European countries. In November 1985 the Dutch Ministry of Education published a policy paper titled Higher Education: Autonomy and Quality. This paper had a proposal that steered away from traditional education and informed that the future of higher education sector should not be regulated by the central government. In 1992 the Law of Higher Education and Research (Wet op het hoger onderwijs en wetenschappelijk onderzoek, article 1.6) was published and became effective in 1993. However, this law governs only certain institutions.

=== New Zealand ===
The Education Act 1989 (s161(2)) defines Academic freedom as: a) The freedom of academic staff and students, within the law, to question and test received wisdom, to put forward new ideas and to state controversial or unpopular opinions; b) The freedom of academic staff and students to engage in research; c) The freedom of the university and its staff to regulate the subject matter of courses taught at the university; d) The freedom of the university and its staff to teach and assess students in the manner they consider best promotes learning; and e) The freedom of the university through its council and vice-chancellor to appoint its own staff.

=== Philippines ===
Academic freedom is protected by the 1987 Philippine Constitution, which states in Article XIV, Section 5 (2), "Academic freedom shall be enjoyed in all institutions of higher learning". Philippine Supreme Court Justice Estela Perlas-Bernabe wrote that "Academic freedom is anchored on the recognition that academic institutions perform a social function, and its business is conducted for the common good; that is, it is a necessary tool for critical inquiry of truth and its free exposition. Thus, the guarantee of academic freedom is complementary to the freedom of expression and the freedom of the mind."

Republic Act 8292 (Higher Education Modernization Act of 1997) states that "all institutions of higher learning, public or private, shall enjoy academic freedom and institutional autonomy". Implementing rules for this law state that "all SUCs shall enjoy academic freedom and institutional autonomy". Academic freedom is also enshrined in Republic Act 9500 (The University of the Philippines Charter of 2008), which states, "the national university has the right and responsibility to exercise academic freedom".

Threats to academic freedom include attempts to establish a military presence in campuses or corporations dictating that a school teach only "marketable courses". Other threats may come in the form of state-sponsored historical distortion and the red-tagging, surveillance, and harassment of students and faculty. In Freedom House's 2025 Academic Freedom Index, the Philippines scored 0.624 (out of 1, 1 is best), the country's lowest score in nearly 40 years.

=== South Africa ===
According to the FAU Academic Freedom Index, in 2025 South Africa scored a 0.83 on a scale of 0 to 1, which has been pretty constant between 2015 and 2025.

==== Academic freedom in the Constitution ====
Section 16(1) of the Constitution of the Republic of South Africa, established in 1996, guarantees everyone the right to freedom of expression, including “academic freedom and freedom of scientific research".

==== Higher education under apartheid South Africa ====
Under apartheid, universities were racially segregated, a legacy that influences the lives of students and academics in South Africa today. The Population Registration Act of 1950 classified South Africans by race, using categories of White, Indian, Coloured, and Black. Based on this legislation, the Extension of University Education Act 45 dictated that students of nonwhite descent were not permitted to register at traditionally white universities unless given expression permission by the minister. As a result, several non-white universities were established, including the University of Durban-Westville for Indians, and the University of the Western Cape at Belleville, open to the Coloured community. Fort Hare University, University of Zululand, and the University of the North at Turfloop were established or reformed as institutions for specific ethnic groups. The higher education system remained starkly segregated until 1988, when the National Party government, led by F.W. de Klerk, put forth a set of policies repealing various systematic segregationist laws.

===== Movements and controversies =====
As of 2007, there have been scandals over the restricted academic freedom at a number of universities in South Africa. The University of KwaZulu-Natal received fame over its restricted academic freedom and the scandal that occurred in 2007. Fazel Khan was fired in April 2007 for "bringing the university into disrepute" after releasing information to the news media about being airbrushed from a photograph in a campus publication because of his participation in a staff strike. The South African Council on Higher Education released a report stating that the state is influencing academic freedom. Public universities are more susceptible to political pressure because they receive funds from the public.

Among postdoctoral fellows, there exist sentiments of being taken advantage of, based on the personal testimonies of postdoctoral fellows at the University of Johannesburg. While these conversations occur in many postdoctoral settings, much of the conversation arises from South Africa, where fellows report that the unstable nature of postdoctoral contracts is lends itself to insufficient compensation disproportionate to the demand for fellows. Multiple accounts and reports from postdoctoral fellows have shown two conflicting ideas: one believing the postdoc system to be a reliable pathway for a future scholarly career and one perceiving the system as unreliable and exploitive.

Institutional capture and patronage networks, informal institutions intertwined with South Africa's academic landscape, Jonas Magedi argues, compromises the integrity of higher education. Specifically, pressure from external sources may suppress dissent and inhibit further growth, especially in the area of humanities.

=== Turkey ===
In 2016, Erdogan was given the power to appoint professors by decree. This, along with firings, harassment and imprisonment of academics helped to drop Turkey to one of the countries with the lowest academic freedom in the world by 2021, leading to protests at institutions like Boğaziçi University.

=== United Kingdom ===
The Robbins Report on Higher Education, commissioned by the British government and published in 1963, devoted a full chapter, Chapter XVI, to Academic freedom and its scope. This gives a detailed discussion of the importance attached both to freedom of individual academics and of the institution itself. In a world, both then and now, where illiberal governments are all too ready to attack freedom of expression, the Robbins committee saw the (then) statutory protection given to academic freedom as giving some protection for society as a whole from any temptation to mount such attacks.

When Margaret Thatcher's government sought to remove many of the statutory protections of academic freedom which Robbins had regarded as so important, she was partly frustrated by a hostile amendment to her bill in the House of Lords. This incorporated into what became the 1988 Education Reform Act, the legal right of academics in the UK 'to question and test received wisdom and to put forward new ideas and controversial or unpopular opinions without placing themselves in jeopardy of losing their jobs or the privileges they may have'. These principles of academic freedom are thus articulated in the statutes of most UK universities. Professor Kathleen Stock formerly of University of Sussex resigned from her role due to controversy from students and the media regarding her transphobic views. In response to such concerns, the Equality and Human Rights Commission has issued guidance. The Guidance provides detailed procedures for universities to consider in determining whether or not specific events can go ahead. It also provides ways to reduce any potential barriers for freedom of speech in regards to specific events. The guidance also makes clear the statutory requirement of universities to ensure they protect freedom of speech on campus however as well as compliance with the Prevent Strategy and the Equality Act 2010. In 2016 the Warden of Wadham College Oxford, a lawyer previously Director of Public Prosecutions, pointed out that the Conservative government's anti-terrorism "Prevent" strategy legislation has placed on universities 'a specific enforceable duty ... to prevent the expression of views that are otherwise entirely compatible with the criminal law'.

=== United States ===
Academic freedom started in America after the Civil War disrupted the previously stagnating systems of higher education. The educational system that Germany had was analyzed by universities to progress fields of research. Johns Hopkins University was the first to use this education system.

Prior to the turn of the twentieth century, a professor by the name of Edward Ross published the free silver movement supporting document known as Honest Dollars. The document placed the professor in political disagreement with the founders of Stanford University. The Stanford family made their money from the railroad industry that the professor had publicly ridiculed. In 1900, the professor expressed politically charged statements that called for the expulsion of Japanese immigrants from the country which would lead to his termination from the university. This decision was followed by seven other professors resigning from the university and elevated the matter to national scrutiny. This event would set in motion the creation of the AAUP to provide monetary and legal security, filling the gaps in many of their contracts.

In the United States, academic freedom is generally taken as the notion of academic freedom defined by the "1940 Statement of Principles on Academic Freedom and Tenure", jointly authored by the American Association of University Professors (AAUP) and the Association of American Colleges and Universities. (Note: 1940 Statement of Principles on Academic Freedom and Tenure, AAUP "AAUP: 1940 Statement of Principles on Academic Freedom and Tenure". Archived from the original on 2007-02-08., accessed March 23, 2007) These principles state that "Teachers are entitled to freedom in the classroom in discussing their subject." The statement also permits institutions to impose "limitations of academic freedom because of religious or other aims", so long as they are "clearly stated in writing at the time of the appointment". The principle also refers to the ability of teachers, students, and educational institutions to pursue knowledge without unreasonable political or government interference. The Principles have only the character of private pronouncements, not that of binding law. In short the statement argues that professors have the privilege to search for truth and knowledge and the right to impart those truths and knowledge to others, including students, the academy, and the general public, unfettered by political or ideological pressure.

Since being drafted, this definition has undergone two revisions in 1970 and 1999 respectively. The 1970 revision declares that the protections of academic freedom "apply not only to the full-time probationary and the tenured teacher, but also to all others, such as part-time faculty and teaching assistants, who exercise teaching responsibilities". The 1999 revision places emphasis on the idea that post-tenure review should be conducted in a manner that respects academic freedom and due process.

In 1957, the U.S. Supreme Court began to take up the matter starting with the case of Sweezy v. New Hampshire. In Keyishian v. Board of Regents (1967), the Supreme Court made connections between the First Amendment and academic freedom as an especially important protection on the grounds that it was crucial to everyone. Such First Amendment protections only applied to public institutions, and academic freedom contains protections outside of the First Amendment as the Court never outright declared that it contained academic freedom.

Some accreditors work with American colleges and universities, including private and religious institutions, to support academic freedom in various forms, although this varies by accreditor. Additionally, the AAUP, which is not an accrediting body, works with these same institutions. The AAUP does not always agree with the accrediting bodies on the standards of protection of academic freedom and tenure. (Note: For example, the Northwest Association of Schools and of Colleges and Universities reviewed Brigham Young University's academic freedom statement and found it in compliance with the 1940 statement, while AAUP has found Brigham Young University to be in violation) The AAUP censures those colleges and universities which it has found, after its own investigations, to violate these principles. By 2022, 88 percent of four-year colleges and universities will limit student free speech, reversing a 15-year trend, according to the College Speech Codes annual report. The Foundation for Individual Rights and Expression (FIRE) reported that 426 out of 486 institutions have at least one policy restricting student speech.

==== For institutions ====
A prominent feature of the English university concept is the freedom to appoint faculty, set standards and admit students. This ideal may be better described as institutional autonomy and is distinct from whatever freedom is granted to students and faculty by the institution.

The Supreme Court of the United States said that academic freedom means a university can "determine for itself on academic grounds:

1. who may teach,
2. what may be taught,
3. how it should be taught, and
4. who may be admitted to study." (Note: Regents of the University of California v. Bakke, 438 U.S. 265, 312 (1978).) (Note: Sweezy v. New Hampshire, 354 U.S. 234, 262–263 (1957) (Felix Frankfurter, Justice).) (Note: Stronach v. Virginia State University, civil action 3:07-CV-646-HEH (E. D. Va. Jan. 15, 2008).)

In a 2008 case, a federal court in Virginia ruled that professors have no academic freedom; all academic freedom resides with the university or college. In that case, Stronach v. Virginia State University, a district court judge held "that no constitutional right to academic freedom exists that would prohibit senior (university) officials from changing a grade given by (a professor) to one of his students." The court relied on mandatory precedent of the U.S. Supreme Court case of Sweezy v. New Hampshire and a case from the fourth circuit court of appeals. (Note: See Urofsky v. Gilmore, 216 F.3d 401, 414, 415 (4th Cir. 2000). (Noting that "cases that have referred to a First Amendment right of academic freedom have done so generally in terms of the institution, not the individual ...." and "Significantly, the court has never recognized that professors possess a First Amendment right of academic freedom to determine for themselves the content of their courses and scholarship, despite opportunities to do so".) The Stronach court also relied on persuasive cases from several circuits of the courts of appeals, including the first, (Note: Lovelace v. S.E. Mass. University, 793 F.2d 419, 425 (1st Cir. 1986) ("To accept plaintiff's contention that an untenured teacher's grading policy is constitutionally protected ... would be to constrict the university in defining and performing its educational mission".)) third, (Note: Edwards v. California University of Pennsylvania, 156 F.3d 488, 491 (3d Cir. 1998) ("In Edwards v. Cal. Univ. of Pa., The court held that the First Amendment does not allow a university professor to decide what is taught in the classroom but rather protects the university's right to select the curriculum," as cited in Stronach.)) (Note: Brown v. Amenti, 247 F.3d 69, 75 (3d Cir. 2001). (Holding "a public university professor does not have a First Amendment right to expression via the school's grade assignment procedures".)) and seventh (Note: Wozniak v. Conry, 236 F.3d 888, 891 (7th Cir. 2001). (Holding that "No person has a fundamental right to teach undergraduate engineering classes without following the university's grading rules ...." and that "it is the [u]niversity's name, not [the professor]'s, that appears on the diploma; the [u]niversity, not [the professor], certifies to employers and graduate schools a student's successful completion of a course of study. Universities are entitled to assure themselves that their evaluation systems have been followed; otherwise their credentials are meaningless".)) circuits. That court distinguished the situation when a university attempts to coerce a professor into changing a grade, which is clearly in violation of the First Amendment, from when university officials may, in their discretionary authority, change the grade upon appeal by a student. (Note: See Parate v. Isibor, 868 F.2d 821, 827–28 (6th Cir. 1989). (Holding that "a university professor may claim that his assignment of an examination grade or a final grade is communication protected by the First Amendment ... [t]hus, the individual professor may not be compelled, by university officials, to change a grade that the professor previously assigned to her student".) The Stronach case has gotten significant attention in the academic community as an important precedent.

==== Relationship to freedom of speech ====
Academic freedom and free speech rights are not coextensive, although this widely accepted view has been challenged by an "institutionalist" perspective on the First Amendment. Academic freedom involves more than speech rights; for example, it includes the right to determine what is taught in the classroom. The AAUP gives teachers a set of guidelines to follow when their ideas are considered threatening to religious, political, or social agendas. When teachers speak or write in public, whether via social media or in academic journals, they are able to articulate their own opinions without the fear from institutional restriction or punishment, but they are encouraged to show restraint and clearly specify that they are not speaking for their institution. In practice, academic freedom is protected by institutional rules and regulations, letters of appointment, faculty handbooks, collective bargaining agreements, and academic custom.

In the U.S., the freedom of speech is guaranteed by the First Amendment, which states that "Congress shall make no law... abridging the freedom of speech, or of the press...." By extension, the First Amendment applies to all governmental institutions, including public universities. The U.S. Supreme Court has historically held that academic freedom is a First Amendment right at public institutions. (Note: Sweezy v. New Hampshire, 354 U.S. 234 (1957); Keyishian v. Board of Regents, 385 U.S. 589 (1967); Regents of Univ. of Michigan v. Ewing, 474 U.S. 214 (1985).) However, the United States' First Amendment has generally been held to not apply to private institutions, including religious institutions. These private institutions may honor freedom of speech and academic freedom at their discretion.

==== Controversies ====
===== Evolution debate =====
Academic freedom is also associated with a movement to introduce intelligent design as an alternative explanation to evolution in US public schools. Supporters claim that academic institutions need to fairly represent all possible explanations for the observed biodiversity on Earth, rather than implying no alternatives to evolutionary theory exist, although in practice are interested in possible explanations from only one of the world's religious traditions, the Abrahamic religions.

Critics of the movement claim intelligent design is religiously motivated pseudoscience and cannot be allowed into the curriculum of US public schools due to the First Amendment to the United States Constitution, often citing Kitzmiller v. Dover Area School District as legal precedent. They also reject the allegations of discrimination against proponents of intelligent design, of which investigation showed no evidence.

A number of "academic freedom bills" have been introduced in state legislatures in the United States between 2004 and 2008. The bills were based largely upon language drafted by the Discovery Institute, the hub of the Intelligent Design movement, and derive from language originally drafted for the Santorum Amendment in the United States Senate. According to The Wall Street Journal, the common goal of these bills is to expose more students to articles and videos that undercut evolution, most of which are produced by advocates of intelligent design or biblical creationism. The American Association of University Professors has reaffirmed its opposition to these bills, including any portrayal of creationism as a scientifically credible alternative and any misrepresentation of evolution as scientifically controversial. As of 2013, only the Louisiana bill has been successfully passed into law.

===== ALFP debate (2014) =====
In 2014, a debate was held by the Academic Leadership Fellows Program (ALFP), addressing the potential need to either further revise the text, overhaul it completely, or leave it as is. The argument that revision/overhaul is necessary asserts that due to rapid growth of technology in education, introduction of social media (which effectively blurs the line between existing as an academic and an individual with unique interests), increase in international students, and rise in student expectations for return on investment since 1999, the statement no longer applies to modernized academia and thus should be changed. The counterargument to revision/overhaul asserts that the AAUP's statement has aged well, and that overhauling the standard that has existed for decades would only stir up further confusion. Instead, it is necessary to "clearly articulate the statements' intended meaning through education, discussion, and by not supporting inappropriate behavior in the name of academic freedom". This debate took place in front of a live audience, who after hearing both arguments agreed overwhelmingly with keeping the statement as-is.

===== Communism =====
In the 20th century and particularly the 1950s during McCarthyism, there was much public date in print on Communism's role in academic freedom, e.g., Sidney Hook's Heresy, Yes–Conspiracy, No and Whittaker Chambers' "Is Academic Freedom in Danger?" among many other books and articles.

===== Diversity initiatives =====
Since 2014, Harvard Medical School Dean Jeffrey Flier, and American Mathematical Society Vice President Abigail Thompson have contended that academics are asked to support diversity initiatives, and are discouraged from voicing opposition to equity and inclusion through self-censorship, as well as explicit promotion, hiring, and firing.

==== Controversial opinions ====
While some controversies of academic freedom are reflected in proposed laws that would affect large numbers of students through entire regions, many cases involve individual academics that express unpopular opinions or share politically unfavorable information. These individual cases may receive widespread attention and periodically test the limits of, and support for, academic freedom. Several of these specific cases are also the foundations for later legislation.

In 1929, Experimental Psychology professor Max Friedrich Meyer and sociology assistant professor Harmon O. DeGraff were dismissed from their positions at the University of Missouri for advising student Orval Hobart Mowrer regarding distribution of a questionnaire which inquired about attitudes towards partners' sexual tendencies, modern views of marriage, divorce, extramarital sexual relations, and cohabitation. The university was subsequently censured by the American Association of University Professors in an early case regarding academic freedom due a tenured professor.

In 2006, Lawrence Summers, while president of Harvard University, led a discussion that was intended to identify the reasons why fewer women chose to study science and mathematics at advanced levels. He suggested that the possibility of intrinsic gender differences in terms of talent for science and mathematics should be explored. He became the target of considerable public backlash. His critics were, in turn, accused of attempting to suppress academic freedom. Due to the adverse reception to his comments, he resigned after a five-year tenure. Another significant factor of his resignation was several votes of no-confidence placed by the deans of schools, notably multiple professors in the Faculty of Arts and Sciences.

In 2009 Thio Li-ann withdrew from an appointment at New York University School of Law after controversy erupted about some anti-gay remarks she had made, prompting a discussion of academic freedom within the law school. Subsequently, Li-ann was asked to step down from her position in the NYU Law School.

In 2009 the University of California at Santa Barbara accused William I. Robinson of antisemitism after he circulated an email to his class containing photographs and paragraphs of the Holocaust juxtaposed to those of the Gaza Strip. Robinson was fired from the university, but later the accusations were dropped after a worldwide campaign against the management of the university.

According to a report by the Middle East Studies Association (MESA) in October 2026, after October 7, 2023, anti-genocide and pro-Palestinian demonstrations were held at universities in the United States and Canada, university administrators punished employees regardless of their rank or position. Of the 196 recorded cases of job retaliation, 76, or about 40%, resulted in dismissal.

== See also ==
- Academic bias – Bias of scholars allowing their beliefs to shape their research
- Freedom of education – Parental right
- Intellectual freedom – Freedom to hold, receive and disseminate ideas without restriction
- Network for Education and Academic Rights
- Right to science and culture – Human right
- Scientific dissent – Dissent from scientific consensus
- Speech code – Non-statutory restriction on word choice
- Value pluralism – Idea in ethics; many principles are true at the same time
- Viewpoint discrimination – Discrimination based on point of view
