= Evan Coyne Maloney =

American filmmaker

- Born: October 27, 1972 (age 54); United States
- Education: Bucknell University
- Occupation: Filmmaker

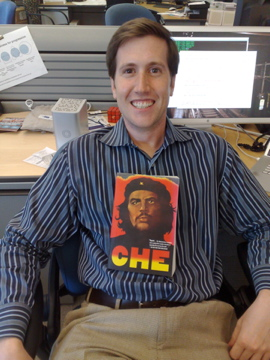
Maloney in 2008

Evan Coyne Maloney (born October 27, 1972), is an inactive American documentary filmmaker, the editor of the now defunct website Brain Terminal and a video blogger. A New York Sun profile in 2005 said that Maloney "may very well be America's most promising conservative documentary filmmaker." He has been described as the conservative answer to Michael Moore. Since 2013, Maloney has not been active in politics or filmmaking and his whereabouts and activities are unknown.

== Early life and education ==
"Shortly after his tenth birthday," according to Maloney's biography on his own website, Brain Terminal, he "was introduced to his two main passions: politics and technology." Politics was the subject of family dinner-table discussions, and his parents were liberal, so he handed out flyers in Manhattan for Walter Mondale's presidential campaign. Talk radio, however, introduced him to conservative ideas, and when Maloney, as a student at JHS 167, had to give a classroom presentation on nuclear weapons, he rejected "the propaganda propagated in schools... that President Reagan was going to drive us headlong into nuclear war," knowing "viscerally that our weapons protected our country and helped keep the peace." In an interview with the New York Sun, Maloney described that incident in this way: when delivering a classroom presentation "about the danger of nuclear weapons," he "realized I didn't believe a word I was saying." In 1989 he volunteered on Rudolph Giuliani's mayoral campaign.

Maloney learned at an early age about computer programming, and at age twelve wrote an Apple II program called Foscil DOS, "a disk operating system that was marketed through magazines and stores."

He attended Bucknell University, where he published a conservative newspaper, The Sentinel.

He later said that he and other students at Bucknell "were being preached to about sensitivity and tolerance, but when no tolerance was shown to people sharing my opinion, it seemed that the university didn't care."

He graduated from Bucknell University in 1994 with a Bachelor of Science in Business Administration.

== Career ==
In the mid-1990s, Maloney served as chief of staff for a New York State Assembly campaign and as campaign manager for two candidates in Civil Court Judge races.

From 1994 to early 2002, Maloney worked principally as a software developer for Internet start-ups. From 1995 thru 1998, Maloney was the lead developer of UNET's KeepTalking web chat server.

In 1996, Maloney co-developed DarkHorse: The Virtual Campaign Game for MSNBC and Byron Preiss Multimedia.

In February 2003, Maloney posted the video Protesting the Protesters to his website. The video featured street interviews at an anti-war protest in New York City. Although his site was fairly obscure at the time, several media outlets took notice, and within a day of his posting the video it was featured on Special Report with Brit Hume. A day later, audio clips from the interviews were featured on Rush Limbaugh's radio show.

Since then, Maloney's website has become popular, receiving more than 5 million hits by the end of 2003 and logging over 6 million hits in 2004.

He then took a position as communications director for a New York State Senate campaign.

Since then he has been working as a freelance writer, business consultant, software developer, and filmmaker.

== Filmmaking ==
According to one account, a PBS report's suggestion that anti-Iraq War protesters waving pictures of George W. Bush with a Hitler mustache represented mainstream American opinion inspired Maloney "to take to the streets, infiltrate anti-war marches and rallies, film what went on and post the results online." The resulting video, "Protesting the Protesters", was posted on his website in February 2003. Although his site was fairly obscure at the time, several media outlets took notice, and within a day of his posting the video it was featured on Special Report with Brit Hume. A day later, audio clips from the interviews were featured on Rush Limbaugh's radio show.

After that episode, Maloney's website became popular, receiving more than 5 million hits by the end of 2003 and logging over 6 million hits in 2004.

According to one account, Maloney's career as a documentary filmmaker began when he "confronted Moore outside his Manhattan apartment in autumn 2003 with charges that he had shamelessly used his public platform to promote liberal causes." Moore "was charm itself" and pleaded guilty, adding "that if Maloney felt so strongly, he should have a crack at his own film project. So Maloney used his online video of the exchange to put out an appeal for funding." He received support from entrepreneur Stuart Browning.

In late 2003, Maloney co-founded On The Fence Films, a film production company with entrepreneur Stuart Browning and entertainment attorney Blaine Greenberg. Their first release, Brainwashing 101 is a short documentary analyzing the political environments on three college campuses: Bucknell University, the University of Tennessee and California Polytechnic. The film was named one of the "10 Best Documentary Films of 2004" by the Liberty Film Festival, and John Fund of The Wall Street Journal reported that it was "the clear favorite of festival attendees" at the American Film Renaissance.

Browning, founder of Embarcadero Technologies, "suggested that he make a full-length feature about the tyranny of political correctness and affirmative action on campuses." Browning gave him $250,000 to make the film that became "Brainwashing 101", which examines the political environments on three college campuses: Bucknell University, the University of Tennessee, and California Polytechnic.

In the fall of 2005, On The Fence Films released Maloney's follow-up film Brainwashing 201: The Second Semester, another short film focusing on higher education. Brainwashing 201 has only been screened once, at the Liberty Film Festival, where it won the award for "Best Short Film of 2005."

On The Fence Films released Indoctrinate U, the feature-length follow-up to Brainwashing 101 and Brainwashing 201: The Second Semester, in April 2007. An article in The New York Times mentioning Indoctrinate U attracted strong criticism from Maloney and Greg Lukianoff of the Foundation for Individual Rights in Education.

== Brainwashing 101 ==
Maloney wrote, directed, and edited the short documentary "Brainwashing 101" (2004). It examines left-wing intolerance at three colleges, Bucknell, Cal Poly, and the University of Tennessee. The New York Sun called it an "attempt to confirm the worst assumptions that conservatives have about what goes on at universities," and described its subjects as "the spread of noxious speech codes, abuses of power by vindictive administrators, and the arbitrary restrictions on academic freedom imposed on conservative students—cases of which, the film argues, are increasingly cropping up in universities."

According to the Sun, "Brainwashing 101" "was hailed as the 'most anticipated' documentary in 2005 by the American Film Renaissance, an upstart film institute based in Dallas." An audience at the Liberty Festival in Los Angeles reportedly gave a preview version of the film a standing ovation. And a critic for the Hollywood Web site Ain't It Cool News said that the film, in its first cut, was one of the most "horrifying and hysterical documentaries I have ever seen."

One reviewer commented: "Maloney tells the truth when he says the academic world is run by intolerant leftist ideologues, who try to stamp out dissent while proclaiming themselves the apostles of 'diversity.' The film is fast-paced, easy to watch, and done in a light enough style to keep it from sounding doom-and-gloom."

== Indoctrinate U ==
Maloney wrote and directed the full-length documentary Indoctrinate U (2007). In Indoctrinate U, reported the Times Higher Education Supplement, Maloney "levels his video camera at campuses that, he says, have become hotbeds of America-bashing radicalism and zealous political correctness and that tolerate no dissenting (read conservative) opinions." "Judging by the rough cut" of Indoctrinate U, wrote Damian Thompson in The Daily Telegraph before the film's release, "the movie will be as slick and incisive as anything by Michael Moore." Describing Maloney as "the Anti-Michael Moore," Thompson wrote that the filmmaker "is on a mission to expose through his film what he sees as the astonishingly vicious persecution of conservative students by university professors and administrators." Stanley Kurtz wrote at National Review that the film was "a fun and powerful piece of work that deserves a wide audience," and that its "real force...flows from Maloney's recounting of a series of incidents of campus political correctness. I had never heard of any of these cases. Yet each of them is remarkable."

== Hating Breitbart ==
Maloney produced the 2012 documentary Hating Breitbart, directed by Andrew Marcus. "The movie follows Breitbart for two years, chronicling his fight against the mainstream media and his battles with the institutional left," according to an account at National Review. Andrew Leigh, also writing in National Review, notes that the filmmakers appeared "to have followed Breitbart everywhere: to tea-party rallies, inside media interviews, through dense convention crowds, in the car, into hotel rooms, even standing watch as he ironed his pants and brushed his teeth. But we don't mind, because the movie delivers generous doses of Breitbart's offbeat charm, and for that alone we ought to be grateful to director Andrew Marcus and producers Maura Flynn and Evan Coyne Maloney."

== The Machine ==
Maloney's 2012 film The Machine is about "how public sector unions corrupt politicians, pick taxpayers' pockets, and make it nearly impossible to hold teachers and other government employees accountable....American taxpayers, by subsidizing public sector unions and the politicians who support them, are being compelled to fund 'the machine'—which, in turn, leads to the perpetual growth of unions and big government."

== Political views ==
"Despite ticking so many Democrat boxes - Irish name, New Yorker, software designer, gay-friendly, non-churchgoer - Evan Maloney is a Republican," wrote a Daily Telegraph reporter in 2005. The reporter noted that Maloney, whom he met in a Union Square coffeeshop, said with anger, "Right here, two days after 9/11, there was a demonstration of people saying we got what we deserved. I was sickened - it was like saying a rape victim had it coming because she dressed provocatively. That's when my passion for politics reignited."

Describing him as "the right's best answer to [Michael] Moore," The New York Sun reported in 2005 that "Maloney describes himself as a 'libertarian conservative' and considers Ronald Reagan his political hero."

== Honors and awards ==
Indoctrinate U won the "Special Jury Prize for Libertarian Ideals" at the 2011 Anthem Awards.
