= 2081 (film) =

2009 featurette

- Film poster
- Directed by: Chandler Tuttle
- Screenplay by: Chandler Tuttle
- Based on: "Harrison Bergeron" by Kurt Vonnegut
- Produced by: Thor Halvorssen
- Starring: James Cosmo; Julie Hagerty; Armie Hammer
- Narrated by: Patricia Clarkson
- Cinematography: Austin Schmidt
- Edited by: Chandler Tuttle
- Music by: Lee Brooks
- Production company: Halvorssen/Tuttle Productions
- Distributed by: The Moving Picture Institute
- Release date: May 29, 2009
- Running time: 26 minutes
- Country: United States
- Language: English
- Budget: $100,000

2081 is a 2009 science fiction featurette which premiered at the Seattle International Film Festival on May 29, 2009. It is directed and written by Chandler Tuttle, based on the 1961 short story "Harrison Bergeron" by author Kurt Vonnegut. The cast is led by James Cosmo, Julie Hagerty, Patricia Clarkson, and Armie Hammer. The story includes the use of hyperbole in a future in which a powerful, dictatorial government goes to extreme measures to ensure that absolute equality exists between all individuals.

== Plot ==
In 2081, American society is a dystopia, in which all individual inequality has been erased by the fictional 211th, 212th, and 213th Amendments to the Constitution and the "unceasing vigilance of the United States Handicapper General", after that cabinet office was created to ensure a "golden age of equality" in the United States. Being exceptional in this world is destroyed in the name of equality, achieved through the use of "handicaps"—physical devices used to nullify every inborn advantage any person might have over another: "The strong wear weights, the beautiful wear masks, and the intelligent wear earpieces that fire off loud noises to keep them from taking unfair advantage of their brains."

Following closely with Vonnegut's original story, 2081 begins with George and Hazel Bergeron—parents of the exceptionally strong, intelligent, handsome Harrison Bergeron—sitting in their living room, watching The Sleeping Beauty ballet on television. George carries many "handicaps", wearing an earpiece and heavy weights to counteract his intelligence and strength, respectively. Hazel, being perfectly average and capable of only carrying thoughts in "short bursts", wears none.

Six years prior, Harrison was taken in a raid on their home by a SWAT team from the office of the Handicapper General. Sitting on his sofa, George tries to think about the event, but cannot quite bring himself to recall exactly what happened, due to the painful intermittent bursts sent through his earpiece. He continues to watch the ballet, instead. The ballet is interrupted by a government news report being read by an anchor with a severe speech impediment about the escaped fugitive Harrison Bergeron. George watches the report with a hint of interest. The report concludes and returns to the regularly scheduled ballet, featuring delicate ballerinas heavily weighed down to ensure that they are only as graceful as the average person. Just then, loud stomps can be heard approaching the stage, as the ballerinas cower in terror. Harrison Bergeron marches down the aisle and leaps onto the stage with a heavy thud, almost unhindered by the weight of his massive handicaps. In a deviation from Vonnegut's story, he begins his address to the audience in the theater and those watching at home by claiming to have a bomb under the stage, the detonator to which he holds in his hand. The audience listens to his address in shock as he peels off his handicaps and chooses a volunteer ballerina to do the same. He takes her hand, and for a few brief moments, the two dance, unhindered, as the audience watches, mystified by the pair's unbridled grace and elegance.

The enforcers of the Handicapper General, keen to keep this display under wraps, surround the theater and quickly cut the video feed to the television audience as the Handicapper General herself marches down the aisle with a shotgun. On cue, Harrison pushes the button of his "detonator", which rather than detonating the dummy bomb under the stage, sends a signal to a device that overrides the video block. He looks into the camera with a proud but slightly somber grin. George smiles back at the television. Unaware that the video feed is again being broadcast, the Handicapper General fires the shotgun, killing Harrison and his ballerina. The SWAT team leader, having been unable to stop her before she fired, informs her of their mistake. In surprise and embarrassment, she looks around in realization that this gruesome, atrocious act of oppression has been broadcast for all to see. George stares heartbrokenly into the television as the signal is again blocked, until his train of thought is again broken by the screeching of his headset; true to Vonnegut's telling of the story, the gravity of the moment is lost on them, and they slip back into normalcy.

== Cast ==
- Tammy Bruce as the United States Handicapper General
- Patricia Clarkson as the narrator
- James Cosmo as George Bergeron, is Harrison's father. George's intelligence is above average, so he is forced to wear a handicap radio in his ear that sends out a sharp noise every 20 seconds or so, to prevent George from taking unfair advantage of his brain. As a strong man, he is also weighed down with multiple physical handicaps.
- Julie Hagerty as Hazel Bergeron, is Harrison's mother. Hazel's intelligence is perfectly average without handicaps; she cannot think of anything except in short bursts.
- Armie Hammer as Harrison Bergeron, a genius and a fantastic athlete, has received both the heaviest physical handicaps and the most distracting mental handicaps of any citizen. In Vonnegut's story, he is 14 years old when he is taken by the "H-G men" and escapes a short time later; in the movie, his escape takes place six years after his arrest.

== Production ==
2081 was produced in 2009 for US$100,000 (equivalent to $150,070 in 2025). Reviewers have applauded the film's excellent production values which they consider to be on par with much higher-budget feature-length films. The film features narration by Academy Award nominee Patricia Clarkson and an original score by Lee Brooks performed by the Kronos Quartet and Czech Philharmonic Chamber Orchestra.

== Reception ==
Revolution Science Fiction magazine described the film as "stirring and dramatic" and it "gets right to the point, and nails the adaptation." Novelist and essayist Edward Cline writes that 26-minute 2081 "packs a punch as terrible as Michael Radford’s gritty, nearly two-hour long Nineteen Eighty-Four." Cline says that 2081 can be viewed as a cinematic parable whose purpose is not to be taken literally, but rather to "impart profound and lasting lessons". Film critic Jeremy Heilman described the film as, "Playing like a serious-minded version of Mike Judge’s comedy Idiocracy", calling it "inventive", "clever", and "humorous" while making a "strong statement about the sadness of a world that prizes equality above all else."

The film screened at VonnegutFest in November 2017 at the Kurt Vonnegut Museum and Library, Indianapolis.
