= The Free Market Cure =

Free Market Cure
- Theatrical release poster
- Directed by: Stuart Browning
- Narrated by: Stuart Browning
- Distributed by: The Free Market Cure
- Release date: 2007
- Running time: 27 min (combined) Uninsured in America (2007) Run Time: 9:03; Two Women (2007) Run Time: 4:32; A Short Course in Brain Surgery (2006) Run Time: 5:36; The Lemon (2007) Run Time: 7:46
- Country: United States
- Language: English

The Free Market Cure is a series of four short documentary films, each of which tells a separate story about the failure of socialized medicine in each of the subjects' lives. The films focus on the "single-payer" system as seen in Canada, the likes of which have been advocated by other filmmakers, such as Michael Moore in his film Sicko.

== Purpose ==
The series is meant to offer examples of cautionary tales which question the effectiveness of socialized medicine, particularly for individuals in the United States, whose government is gradually taking steps towards socializing medicine.

== Content ==
=== Uninsured in America ===
This film challenges what the filmmaker calls the "myth" of the suffering uninsured in America. The film gives several pieces of evidence to support its claims. It claims that according to the U.S. Census Bureau's 2007 data, 17 million (38%) of the approximately 45 million uninsured people in the U.S. live in households that have incomes greater than $50,000 per year, an amount that Devon Herrick of the National Center for Policy Analysis asserts is high enough that one could reasonably assume that the household's members should be able to afford some degree of health insurance coverage. Furthermore, 9 million (20%) of the uninsured make more than $75,000 per year. Additional demographics that make up a significant portion of the uninsured are the 18 million 18- to 34-year-olds that the film refers to as the "young invincibles", who spend four times as much money on alcohol, tobacco, entertainment, and dining out as on out-of-pocket healthcare, as well as the estimated 12 million undocumented immigrants in the U.S. that the film asserts receive healthcare without being insured.

In addition to the undocumented immigrants, citizens of other nations can request "compassionate entry" at the U.S. border, and be picked up by American ambulances and taken to American hospitals to receive treatment.

Herrick later says that uninsured people in the United States tend to receive 50-60% of the amount of care that insured people do. He says that, effectively, the country is disincentivizing people from paying for their health insurance.

=== Two Women ===
The short follows a Canadian woman named Janice Fraser, who suffers from a disease that has caused her bladder to stop functioning properly, leading to near constant pain, frequent infections and accompanying high fevers. She needs an operation to insert an electrical implant which would stimulate her bladder to function. However, the Canadian specialist who consults her explains that he is only allowed to perform 12 such operations per year; Janice is number 32 on the list and will likely have to wait nearly 3 years for the operation. Janice and her mother offer to pay for the procedure to get it done more quickly, but are turned down, as this is against Canadian law in the single-payer system. They receive little help from their parliamentary representative, nor from George Smitherman, the Ontario Minister of Health, who the film describes as the "ultimate healthcare gatekeeper for the 12.5 million citizens of Ontario."

Meanwhile, Susan Gapka, a male-to-female transsexual, is able to enlist the help of Smitherman and the government in paying for her sex change operation.

While she waits for her implant, Janice's infections eventually worsen to the point that her bladder must be removed completely to save her life.

=== A Short Course in Brain Surgery ===
Lindsay McCreith is a Canadian man who began having serious headaches and eventually suffered a seizure in January 2006. His doctor suspects a brain tumor may be the cause, and recommends McCreith get an MRI scan, but is told that he will have to wait 4 months. Instead of waiting, private medical broker Rick Baker of Timely Medical Alternatives directs McCreith to get an MRI done in the U.S.; he is able to do so in Buffalo, New York one day later, and learns that he has a golf ball-sized mass in his brain. He proceeds with his medical treatment in the U.S. instead of waiting for it in Canada. Baker says that they were able to compress the entire process, from MRI to consultation to biopsy to surgery, to 4.5 weeks, and estimates that McCreith might have waited as long as 8 months in Canada – a potentially life-threateningly long wait.

McCreith seeks reimbursement from the Canadian government of the $28,000 of medical expenses, but is denied because he did not have the government's proper permission to seek treatment abroad, a process of applications and appeals that can last 8 months.

Baker goes on to state that he is weary of the attempts by some Americans to duplicate the Canadian single-payer healthcare system, saying, "where will I send my clients...you people will be waiting two and three years for surgery, I'll have nowhere to send Canadians."

=== The Lemon ===
The Lemon draws parallels between collectivized healthcare systems and the East German Trabant, a noisy, inefficient, underpowered automobile that was a symbol of communist inefficiency and lack of ingenuity, mostly unchanged for nearly thirty years. East Germans would typically have to wait 8 years to receive their own Trabant, an unappealing vehicle that lacked even basic features, like fuel gauges.

Like East Germans waiting for their Trabants, the movie implies, so do Canadians like Shirley Healey wait for life-saving treatment. Healey suffers from mesenteric ischemia, and is unable to obtain prompt treatment, being told she would have to wait about 2 months. Her doctor, Robert W. Ellett, having seen another patient with the same condition die after waiting 3 months, urges her to seek medical treatment in the U.S. Dr. Ellett explains that while there are sufficient rooms in the local intensive-care unit near her in British Columbia to receive her and other patients after surgery, many of them sit empty, because "they're not funded rooms."

Healey pays for her operation in Washington, and doctors there find that her artery is nearly completely blocked, a life-threatening condition that would have caused her intestines to perfuse inadequately, essentially leading her to starve to death.
