= Stuart Browning =

American filmmaker

- Born: United States
- Education: Virginia Commonwealth University
- Occupations: Entrepreneur, film director, producer, writer

Stuart Browning is a political commentator, writer, film director, film producer and entrepreneur.

Browning produced The Free Market Cure series, a collection of short films arguing against collectivized medicine and for the benefits of free markets in health care. He is a fellow of the Moving Picture Institute, and a producer of Indoctrinate U, and its predecessor Brainwashing 101. Browning was President and co-founder of Embarcadero Technologies from 1995 until February 2000, a leading database software vendor in San Francisco.

== Film shorts ==
- El Uno De Mayo

=== The Free Market Cure Video Series ===
- Uninsured in America (2007) is part of The Free Market Cure series created by filmmaker Stuart Browning about what he calls "the dangers of collectivized medicine and the benefits of free markets in health care." In the film, Browning argues that the number of uninsured Americans is closer to eight million than the forty-five million estimate provided by the Centers for Disease Control and Prevention and from the United States Census and that uninsured Americans have adequate access to health care.
- Dead Meat
- The Lemon
- Two Women
- Short Course in Brain Surgery

== Writings ==
- The Health Care Lies of Paul Krugman
- Leftist Ideologues Advocate a Perverse Health Care System
- Health Care, Lies and Video Tape
- Socialized Medicine is Sicko
