= Indoctrinate U =

2007 American documentary film

- Theatrical poster
- Directed by: Evan Coyne Maloney
- Written by: Evan Coyne Maloney
- Produced by: Blaine Greenberg; Stuart Browning; Thor Halvorssen
- Narrated by: Evan Coyne Maloney
- Cinematography: Oleg Atbashian
- Edited by: Blaine Greenberg
- Music by: Chandler Tuttle; Blaine Greenberg
- Production companies: On the Fence Films; The Moving Picture Institute
- Release dates: March 23, 2007 (Tribeca Film Center, New York, NY)
- Running time: 120 min
- Country: United States
- Language: English

Indoctrinate U is a 2007 American feature-length documentary film written by, directed by and starring Evan Coyne Maloney, that examines controversial topics like equality and fairness, diversity, ideological conformism and political correctness in American institutions of higher education.

== Film content ==
Maloney argues that while students involved with the "campus free speech movement" of the 1960s nobly and successfully defended the rights of students to think and express and freely share ideas, their message subsequently devolved into one that allows only their viewpoints to be heard.

The film portrays incidents where minority critics of controversial policies such as affirmative action, like political activist and former University of California Regent Ward Connerly, are shouted off stage or otherwise have their views marginalized, seemingly without real consideration – often simply by likening them to Nazis or Klansmen to delegitimize them entirely; or how students at Cal State San Bernardino and at other schools across the nation trying to illustrate the inherent racism of affirmative action by holding "affirmative action bake sales" are ironically reprimanded for expressing "hate speech".

Clips of anti-military protests at UC Santa Cruz and San Francisco State University at one point show how protestors demanded that recruiters from the Army Corps of Engineers leave the school's career fair, with such fervor that it led the cancellation of the entire event. Also shown is the treatment of conservative students at the University of Tennessee and Cal Poly.

Also included are the racial and ethnic politics at the University of Michigan and Yale, teaching at Duke and Columbia; interviews with David French and Greg Lukianoff, (then respectively president and director of legal and public advocacy at the Foundation for Individual Rights in Education), Glenn Reynolds, Daniel Pipes, Carol Miller Swain, and others.

== Production ==
=== Filming ===
Maloney spent two and a half years making the documentary by conducting interviews on various college campuses and with various thinkers. The film was preceded by two shorter versions, Brainwashing 101 and Brainwashing 201: The Second Semester. The two shorts led the 2004 American Film Renaissance festival to select Indoctrinate U as its "most anticipated documentary."

Indoctrinate U was produced by On the Fence Films with the support of the Moving Picture Institute, and Stuart Browning, Blaine Greenberg, and Thor Halvorssen. The film's executive producers are Stuart Browning and Blaine Greenberg. Its associate producer is Frayda Levy. It was edited by Chandler Tuttle.

In March 2007, Maloney appeared on Hannity's America to discuss the film. On April 19 of the same year, he appeared on C-SPAN's Washington Journal where they showed clips from the film and took calls.

=== Lawsuit and website closure ===
Original Indoctrinate U poster

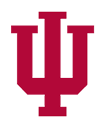
Partial logo of Indiana U.

On November 13, 2007, the official website was taken down and replaced with a notice that read: "Due to threatened legal action from a major taxpayer-funded university, we've temporarily taken down the Indoctrinate U homepage while we assess our options." The website was back up by December 4. Maloney explained in a statement that Indiana University claimed there was a similarity between the university's logo and that of the film's. The Indoctrinate U logo was changed and the website resumed operation. In a note to the Wall Street Journal, Maloney emphasized his ready compliance with IU's demands, saying that while he was confident that the film's logo was not an infringement of IU's rights to their own logo, as the differences of the two are "readily apparent", as well as the fact that "there is also no likelihood of consumer confusion because our product is a film whereas theirs is four years in Bloomington." It was decided that it was simpler to comply with the demands than to fight them, particularly because the logo had little bearing on the film itself. Maloney says that he became more confused when, after the dispute was settled, Indiana University (which doesn't appear in the film) demanded a sum of money from the production company - which Maloney and others viewed as an attempt to bankrupt the company and silence him.

== Reviews ==
A review in The Weekly Standard said, "The documentary combines relatively shocking footage (one professor excitedly tells the camera "whiteness is a form of racial oppression . . . treason to whiteness is loyalty to humanity") with snappy editing to create a documentary that bounces quickly from subject to subject."

Examples of "intellectual thuggery" in the film are nothing more than "the tip of a disgusting iceberg", laments Walter E. Williams, noting that "Several university officials refused to be interviewed for the documentary. They wanted to keep their campus policies under wraps, not only from reporters but parents as well."
