= Kronos Quartet =

American string quartet

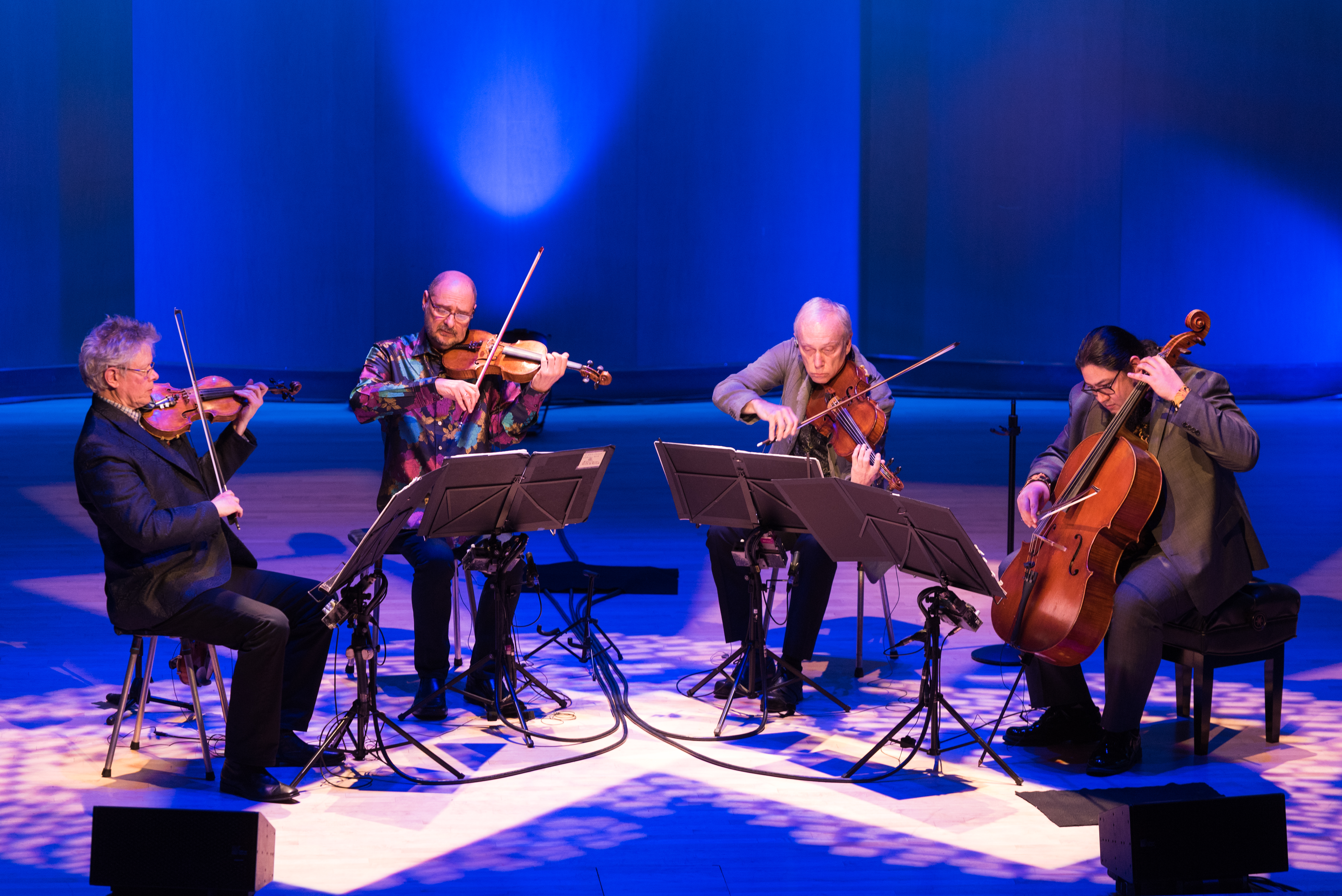
- Kronos Quartet at the Musical Instrument Museum, 2020

Background information
- Origin: Seattle, Washington, U.S.
- Genres: Contemporary classical; minimalism
- Occupation: Chamber ensemble
- Years active: 1973–present
- Labels: Nonesuch/Elektra; Cantaloupe; Dacapo; Landmark; World Circuit; Smithsonian Folkways; Anti; Ondine; Centrediscs
- Members: David Harrington (violin); Gabriela Díaz (violin); Ayane Kozasa (viola); Paul Wiancko (cello)
- Past members: Jim Shallenberger (violin, 1973–1975); Tim Kilian (viola, 1973–1976); Walter Gray (cello, 1973–1978); Roy Lewis (violin, 1975–1976); Richard Balkin (violin 1976–1977); Michael Jones (viola, 1976–1978); Ella Gray (violin, 1977–1978); Joan Jeanrenaud (cello, 1978–1999); Jennifer Culp (cello, 1999–2005); Jeffrey Zeigler (cello, 2005–2013); Sunny Yang (cello, 2013–2022); John Sherba (violin, 1978–2024); Hank Dutt (viola, 1978–2024)
- Website: kronosquartet.org

The Kronos Quartet is an American string quartet based in San Francisco. It has been in existence with a rotating membership of musicians for 50 years. The quartet covers a very broad range of musical genres, including contemporary classical music. More than 1,200 works have been written for it. The quartet has recorded over 75 albums and received a number of awards.

== History ==
The quartet was founded by violinist David Harrington in Seattle, Washington. Its first performance was in November 1973. Since 1978, the quartet has been based in San Francisco, California. It is named after the Greek god Chronos, the "personification of time". The longest-running combination of performers (from 1978 to 1999) had Harrington and John Sherba on violin, Hank Dutt on viola, and Joan Jeanrenaud on cello. In 1999, Jeanrenaud left Kronos because she was "eager for something new"; she was replaced by Jennifer Culp, who, in turn, left in 2005 and was replaced by Jeffrey Zeigler. In June 2013, Zeigler was replaced by Sunny Yang. In February 2023, cellist and composer Paul Wiancko became the quartet's newest cellist. In March 2024, Kronos Quartet announced that Sherba and Dutt would retire in June of that year. They were replaced by violinist Gabriela Díaz and violist Ayane Kosaza.

With over 75 studio albums to its credit and having performed worldwide, the Kronos Quartet has been called "probably the most famous 'new music' group in the world" and been praised in philosophical studies of music for the inclusiveness of its repertoire.

By the time the quartet celebrated its 25th anniversary in 1999, it had a repertoire of over 600 works, including 400 quartets written for it, more than 3,000 performances, seven first-prize ASCAP awards, Edison Awards in classical and popular music, and had more than 1.5 million record sales.

=== 30th anniversary ===
When Kronos turned 30, in 2003, it decided to commission new pieces from composers under age 30, in hopes of encouraging talented young composers. The program, called the Under 30 Project, is now run in cooperation with Carnegie Hall, Cal Performances at the University of California, Berkeley, and the Montalvo Arts Center. The first recipient was Alexandra du Bois (at the time a student at Indiana University, later a Juilliard School graduate), followed by Felipe Perez Santiago (born in Mexico in 1973), and Dan Visconti (born in Illinois in 1982); in 2007, Israeli composer Aviya Kopelman became the fourth.

=== 40th anniversary ===
To celebrate its 40th year, the Kronos Quartet returned to Seattle, the city in which it first played, and worked in collaboration with Seattle's Degenerate Art Ensemble to create a piece incorporating music, dance and video. It celebrated its 40th anniversary with a sold-out performance at Zellerbach Hall, UC Berkeley, in December 2013. The same year, Michael Giacchino, a soundtrack composer who often names his pieces with puns, published a piece named after Kronos, "The Kronos Wartet", as a part of the soundtrack to Star Trek Into Darkness for a scene that takes place on the fictional planet "Kronos". (also spelled "Qo'noS").

== New music, contemporary classical ==
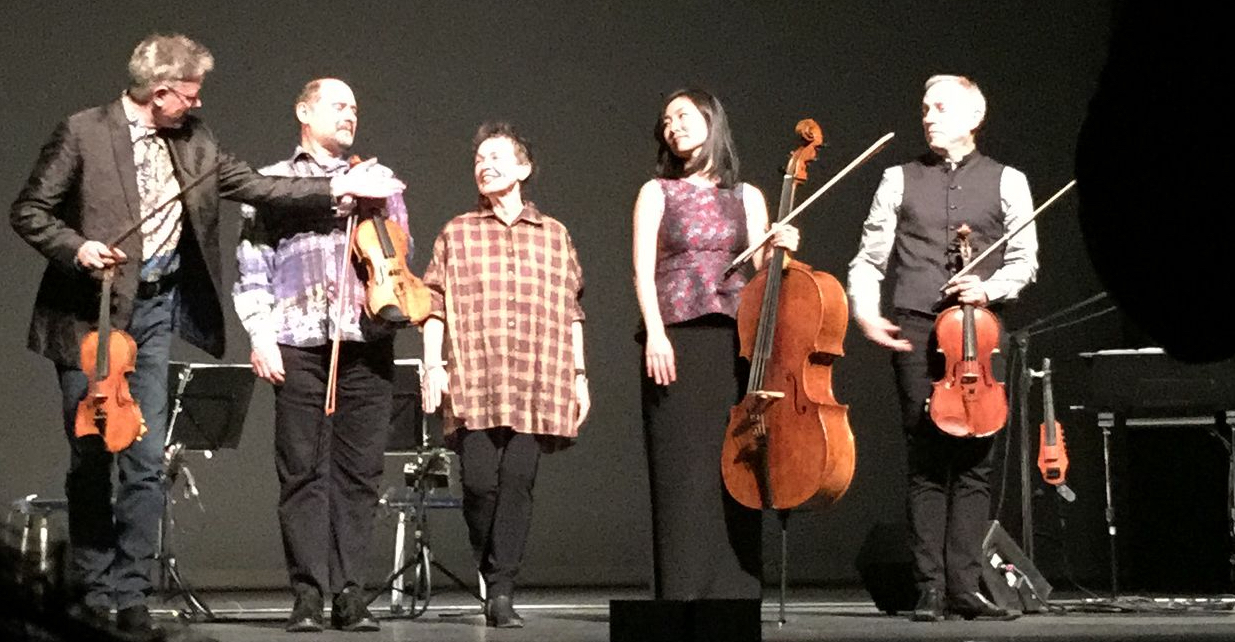
On stage with Laurie Anderson, after performing LANDFALL at the Harris Theater on March 17, 2015

Over 1,000 pieces have been created for the Kronos Quartet, which has a long history of commissioning new works. It has worked with many minimalist composers, including John Adams, Arvo Pärt, George Crumb, Henryk Górecki, Steve Reich, John Luther Adams, Roberto Paci Dalò, Philip Glass, Terry Riley, Peter Sculthorpe and Kevin Volans; collaborators hail from a diversity of countries—Kaija Saariaho from Finland, Pēteris Vasks from Latvia, Franghiz Ali-Zadeh from Azerbaijan, Homayun Sakhi from Afghanistan, Hamza El Din from Egypt, Victoria Vita Polevá from Ukraine and Fernando Otero, Astor Piazzolla, and Osvaldo Golijov from Argentina. Some of Kronos's string-quartet arrangements were published in 2007.

== Diverse genres ==
I've always wanted the string quartet to be vital, and energetic, and alive, and cool, and not afraid to kick ass and be absolutely beautiful and ugly if it has to be. But it has to be expressive of life. To tell the story with grace and humor and depth. And to tell the whole story, if possible.

— David Harrington

Kronos covers a very broad range of musical genres: Mexican folk, experimental, pre-classical early music, movie soundtracks (Requiem for a Dream, Heat, The Fountain), jazz and tango. Kronos has also recorded adaptations of Jimi Hendrix's "Purple Haze", Sigur Rós's "Flugufrelsarinn", Television's "Marquee Moon", Raymond Scott's "Dinner Music for a Pack of Hungry Cannibals", and Bob Dylan's "Don't Think Twice, It's All Right".

The quartet has also worked with a variety of global musicians, including Bollywood playback singer Asha Bhosle; Mexican-American painter Gronk; American soprano Dawn Upshaw; jazz composer/performer Pat Metheny; Mexican rockers Café Tacuba; Azerbaijani mugam singer Alim Qasimov; and the Romanian gypsy band Taraf de Haïdouks among others.

Kronos has performed live with the poet Allen Ginsberg, Astor Piazzolla, The National, the Modern Jazz Quartet, Tom Waits, David Bowie, Paul McCartney and Björk, and has recorded with Nelly Furtado, Rokia Traoré, Joan Armatrading, Brazilian electronica artist Amon Tobin, Texas yodeler Don Walser, Faith No More, Tiger Lillies and David Grisman.

In 1984, Frank Zappa wrote "None of the Above" for Kronos, of which it performs the first movement in the 2020 documentary Zappa, directed by Alex Winter. Kronos's artistic director, founder, and violinist David Harrington is also interviewed in the film.

On the 1998 Dave Matthews Band album Before These Crowded Streets, Kronos Quartet performed on the tracks "Halloween" and "The Stone". It also recorded for the 2007 Nine Inch Nails remix album, Year Zero Remixed doing a rendition of the track "Another Version of the Truth"". The group performed Lee Brooks's score for the short film 2081, based on the Kurt Vonnegut short story "Harrison Bergeron".

In 2009, Kronos contributed an acoustic version of Blind Willie Johnson's "Dark Was the Night" for the AIDS benefit album Dark Was the Night produced by the Red Hot Organization.

In 2017, the quartet performed as featured artists on the songs "Lost Light" and "Journey" on the soundtrack to the videogame Destiny 2.

== Awards and recognition ==
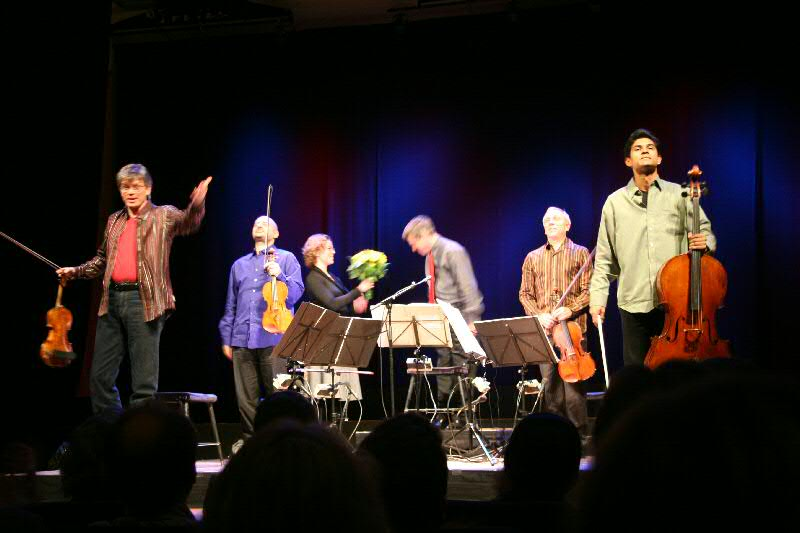
Greeting the audience after a 2005 performance

Le Diapason d'Or de Mai

- 1997 Osvaldo Golijov's The Dreams and Prayers of Isaac the Blind

Rolf Schock Prize

- 1999 Royal Swedish Academy of Music for Musical Arts in Music

Musical America

- 2003 Musicians of the Year

Grammy Award for Best Chamber Music Performance

- 2004 Alban Berg: Lyric Suite

Grammy Award for Best Small Ensemble Performance

- 2018 Laurie Anderson: Landfall

Grammy Award for Best Engineered Album, Classical

- 2020 Terry Riley: Sun Rings

National Academy of Recording Arts and Sciences

- 2005 The Recording Academy President's Merit Award

Polar Music Prize

- 2011. The announcement of the award said: "For almost 40 years, the Kronos Quartet has been revolutionizing the potential of the string quartet genre when it comes to both style and content."

WOMEX Awards

- 2018 WOMEX Artist Award – Since the introduction of the WOMEX Award in 1999, the list of extraordinary artists and professionals deserving of this special praise has continued to grow. The award honours exceptional achievements in world music on the international level; musical excellence, social importance, commercial success, political impact, lifetime achievement

Edison Classical Music Awards (Edison Klassiek)

- 2019 Oeuvreprijs

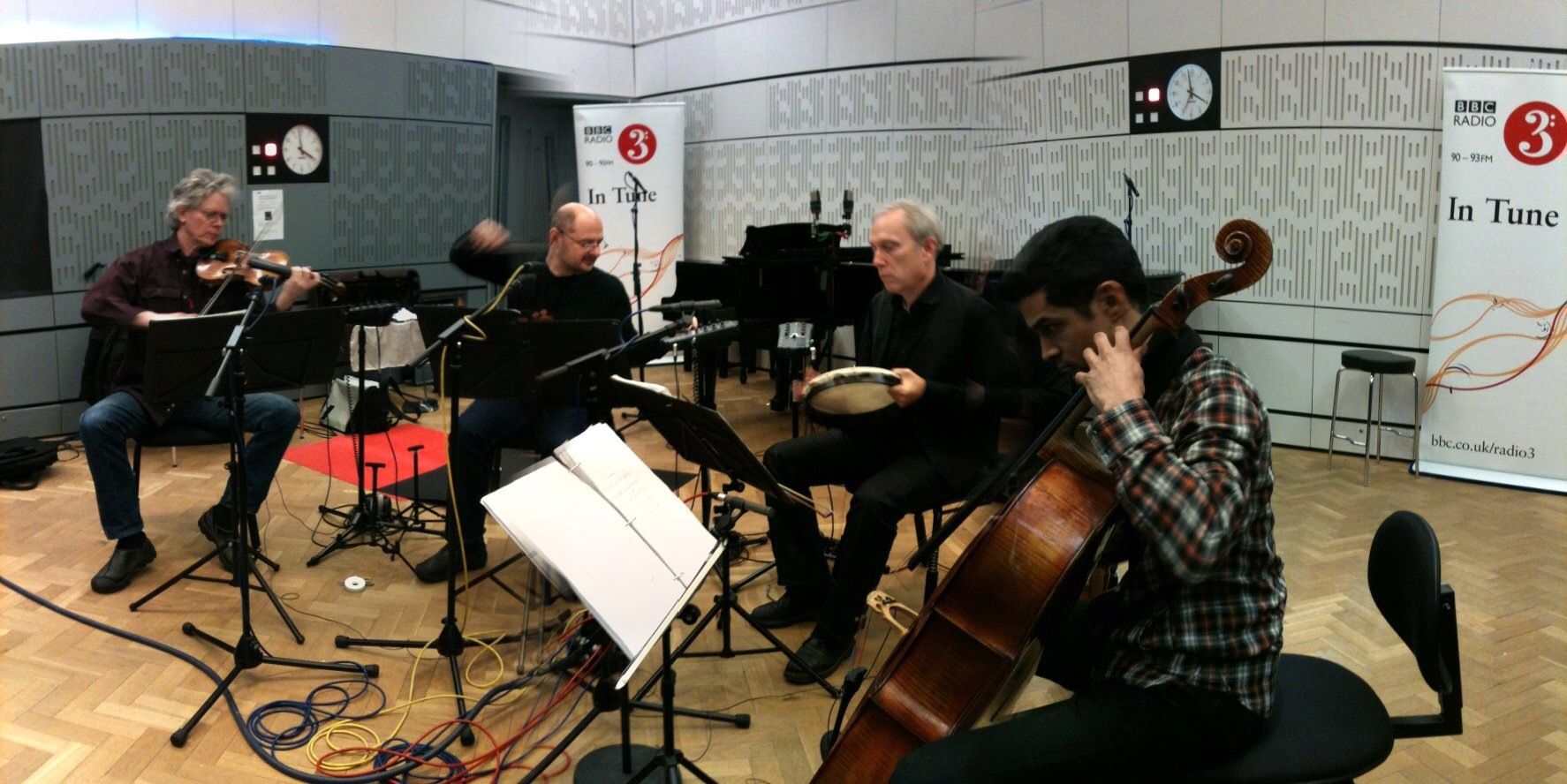
Kronos Quartet recording at BBC Radio, 2012

== Published music ==
- Kronos Collection, Vol. 1. Boosey and Hawkes. 2007.
- Kronos Collection, Vol. 2. Boosey and Hawkes. 2013.

== Films ==
- 1985 – Mishima: A Life in Four Chapters. – Written by Philip Glass featuring Kronos Quartet and Michael Riesman
- 1995 – Heat – Written by Elliot Goldenthal featuring Kronos Quartet
- 1995 – Musical Outsiders: An American Legacy – Harry Partch, Lou Harrison, and Terry Riley. Directed by Michael Blackwood.
- 1998 – Dracula (1931) – alternate score by Philip Glass
- 2000 – Requiem for a Dream Soundtrack by Clint Mansell featuring Kronos Quartet.
- 2000 – The Man Who Cried. Directed by Sally Potter.
- 2006 – The Fountain Soundtrack by Clint Mansell featuring Kronos Quartet and Mogwai.
- 2009 – 2081. Directed by Chandler Tuttle.
- 2013 – Dirty Wars. Directed by Rick Rowley.
- 2014 – The Great Beauty. Directed by Paolo Sorrentino.
