= Chandler Tuttle =

American writer and director

- Education: New York University (BFA)
- Occupations: Writer, Director
- Years active: 2005 - present

Chandler Tuttle is an American writer and director who currently serves as creative director of the Oslo Freedom Forum. He lives in New York City.

== Early life and education ==
Before going to college, Tuttle founded a multimedia design firm in New York whose clients included such media companies as MTV, Condé Nast, and BBDO as well as financial firms such as Goldman Sachs and Morgan Stanley. He is the youngest brother of MacKenzie Scott.

Tuttle attended New York University receiving a Bachelor of Fine Arts (BFA) in Film in 2005.

== Career ==
Tuttle was assistant to the president at Focus Features from March 2005 to March 2007.

He was the graphic designer for the 2007 film “The Libel Tourist,” a documentary about Rachel Ehrenfeld, author of a book on Islamic terrorism, who was sued by a Saudi billionaire in a British court.

Although not cited on IMDb, he is listed on several sites as having worked on Evan Coyne Maloney's 2007 documentary Indoctrinate U. Some sources give him a “designed and edited by” credit on the film. According to Documentary Wire, he edited the film. Other sources credit him and Blaine Greenberg with writing the music.

In a 2008 interview with Sonny Bunch of Doublethink Magazine, Tuttle said that after being shown a rough cut of Indoctrinate U, he told the filmmakers that “the reason you’re having difficulty getting feedback and making progress here is because it really hasn’t gotten a critical mass....What you’re showing people isn’t really a movie.” Tuttle went back to the raw footage and, he said, “rebuilt the film from the ground up. … They gave me carte blanche.” According to Bunch, “Tuttle emerged from his editing bay” with “something that actually looked like a movie – a product that could be tinkered with and perfected before it was released.”

Shortly thereafter, Tuttle was named a fellow of the Motion Picture Institute, which permitted him to leave Focus Features and work full-time on 2081 and other MPI projects, to which he brought not only his film skills but his background in graphic design.

Among the MPI projects to which Tuttle contributed was Free Market Cure, a series of short films replying to Michael Moore’s Sicko, and also “helped design one-sheets – the full-sized movie posters that hang in theaters and outside of screenings – for films under the MPI label.” On one of the Free Market Cure films, Uninsured in America (2007), Tuttle is credited with “Design & Motion Graphics.”

Sonny Bunch of Doublethink Magazine called him “arguably MPI's most important asset.”

Tuttle wrote and directed the 2009 science-fiction film 2081, which was based on Kurt Vonnegut's short story “Harrison Bergeron.” It premiered at the Seattle International Film Festival on May 29, 2009.

From May 2009 to the present, Tuttle has served as creative director of the Oslo Freedom Forum, a non-profit organization that holds a conference every May in Oslo, Norway.

He is a co-producer of Honor Flight, a documentary about World War II veterans, which won awards at the Cleveland, Richmond, Omaha, and GI film festivals in 2013.

As of 2013, according to one report, Tuttle was working on “a feature-length adaptation of Robert A. Heinlein's Hugo Award-winning novel The Moon is a Harsh Mistress.”

He is represented by United Talent Agency and Management 360.

An interviewer noted in 2008 that Tuttle was fond of quoting a sentence from Ayn Rand's Romantic Manifesto: “Art is a selective recreation of reality reflecting the artist’s metaphysical value judgments.”

== Other professional activities ==
He served as a judge at the 2013 Hotchkiss Film Festival.

== Honors and awards ==
In February 2007, Tuttle won a fellowship from the Moving Picture Institute that allowed him to pursue filmmaking full-time.
