= The Coddling of the American Mind =

2018 book by Greg Lukianoff and Jonathan Haidt

- Authors: Greg Lukianoff; Jonathan Haidt
- Audio read by: Jonathan Haidt
- Language: English
- Subject: Psychology
- Publisher: Penguin Books
- Publication date: September 4, 2018
- Publication place: United States
- Media type: Print
- Pages: 352
- ISBN: 978-0735224896
- Website: www.thecoddling.com

The Coddling of the American Mind: How Good Intentions and Bad Ideas Are Setting Up a Generation for Failure is a 2018 book by Greg Lukianoff and Jonathan Haidt. It is an expansion of a popular essay the two wrote for The Atlantic in 2015. Lukianoff and Haidt argue that overprotection is harming university students and that the use of trigger warnings and safe spaces does more harm than good.

== Overview ==
Lukianoff and Haidt argue that many problems on campus have their origins in three "great untruths" that have become prominent in education: "What doesn’t kill you makes you weaker"; "always trust your feelings"; and "life is a battle between good people and evil people". The authors state that these three "great untruths" contradict modern psychology and ancient wisdom from many cultures.

The book goes on to discuss microaggressions, identity politics, "safetyism", call-out culture, and intersectionality. The authors define safetyism as a culture or belief system in which safety (which includes "emotional safety") has become a sacred value, which means that people become unwilling to make tradeoffs demanded by other practical and moral concerns. They argue that embracing the culture of safetyism has interfered with young people’s social, emotional, and intellectual development. Continuing to discuss contemporary partisanship or the "rising political polarization and cross party animosity", they state that the left and right are "locked into a game of mutual provocation and reciprocal outrage".

The authors call on university and college administrators to identify with freedom of inquiry by endorsing the Chicago principles on free speech, through which university and colleges notify students in advance that they do not support the use of trigger warnings or safe spaces. They suggest specific programs, such as LetGrow, Lenore Skenazy's Free Range Kids, teaching children mindfulness, and the basics of cognitive behavioral therapy (CBT). They encourage a charitable approach to the interpretations of other people's statements instead of assuming they meant offense.

In their conclusion, the authors write that there will be positive changes soon as universities "develop a different sort of academic culture—one that finds ways to make students from all identity groups feel welcome without using the divisive methods." They say that "market forces will take care of the rest" as "applications and enrollment" surge at these schools.

=== Safetyism ===
Safetyism is an approach to policy that seeks to prioritize feelings of safety. According to Haidt and Lukianoff, this comes at the cost of academic intellectual rigor, open debate, and free expression of ideas. Safetyism seeks to regulate some speech or intellectual environments by minimizing the array of ideas or beliefs that make some or most people in that environment feel uncomfortable. The Coddling of the American Mind describes a rise in this approach within higher education in the United States.

Safetyism is also considered an ideology that places self-perceived safety, especially the feeling of being protected from disagreeable ideas and information, above all other concerns. It is based on the belief that it is harmful to experience uncomfortable emotions. Compared to prior generations, one of the main differences is the belief that the world should not be organized according to what is right or wrong but according to what is safe or unsafe.

The term was coined by Pamela Paresky and promulgated by The Coddling of the American Mind, which described its status as "a sacred value", meaning that it was not possible to make practical tradeoffs or compromises with other desirable things (e.g., for people to be made to feel uncomfortable in support of free speech or learning new ideas).

Lukianoff and Haidt say that underneath safetyism lie three core beliefs:

- that most people are not psychologically resilient,
- that emotional reasoning (e.g., "I feel lonely; therefore I am unlovable") produces valid, accurate understanding of events and the world, and
- that the world operates in an us versus them manner, particularly in the form of identity politics.

==== Development ====
The belief spread across universities in the United States and Canada, beginning with elite US universities during the early 21st century and accelerating in 2013. It has been compared to scope creep and the overall expansion of the concept of safety in other areas, such as school programs to address severe bullying being slowly expanded to provide adult intervention for ordinary, one-time incidents. People who support safetyism are more likely to self-report cognitive distortions (e.g., assuming the worst), to believe that words can cause harm, and to approve of trigger warnings. By contrast, Greg Lukianoff believes that words and ideas alone, unless turned into action, can never cause real harm.

The desire to promote these feelings of safety resulted in universities promoting practices such as content warnings (e.g., telling students in advance that the homework contains disagreeable information about racism), safe spaces (e.g., a designated room where students who support trans rights can avoid those who disagree), and bias-response teams (e.g., university employees who can be called in case of non-criminal racist speech).

Later, the idea spread to other academic areas, such as scholarly publications. Proponents of safetyism say that certain provocative and unpopular ideas, such as proposing that self-determined transracial identities be socially accepted in the same way that self-determined transgender identities are, are so inherently threatening, harmful, or emotionally damaging to any marginalized students and scholars who might read it, that academic journals should not publish the ideas.

Outside of academia, safetyism has been used to justify the removal of monuments to enslavers and racist historical figures, rather than countering the historical expressive speech glorifying them with modern expressive speech condemning them.

On the political left, safetyism is used to suppress criticism of trans rights; disagreement with the liberal political viewpoint is claimed to harm trans people.

== Policy discussions ==
Lukianoff and Haidt argue that campus policies rooted in safetyism, driven by the three "Great Untruths," prioritize emotional safety over intellectual rigor, harming students' resilience and open dialogue. They critique practices like trigger warnings (e.g., alerts about potentially distressing course content), safe spaces (e.g., designated areas to avoid challenging ideas), and bias-response teams (e.g., administrative units addressing non-criminal offensive speech), which they see as shielding students from discomfort at the expense of free inquiry.

These policies often stem from a common enemy identity politics approach, which the authors contrast with "common humanity identity politics." Drawing on social psychology, they describe the former as uniting groups against perceived adversaries, framing conflicts as good versus evil, akin to the Bedouin proverb: "Me against my brother; me and my brother against our cousin; me, my brother, and cousin against the stranger." This divisive approach, tied to the third "Great Untruth" (life as a battle between good and evil people), fuels cancel culture and a hostile speech climate on campuses, where fear of anonymous reporting or shaming discourages open expression.

By contrast, common humanity identity politics, exemplified by civil rights leaders like Martin Luther King Jr., emphasizes shared values and inclusion, advocating for equal dignity while fostering unity. The authors argue that universities should reject policies that enable divisive identity politics and instead adopt frameworks like the Chicago principles on free speech, which prioritize open dialogue and exposure to diverse ideas. They advocate for a trusting "speak up culture" where students and faculty can share opinions without fear of punishment, promoting intellectual progress and emotional resilience.

== Release ==
The book reached number eight on The New York Times hardcover nonfiction best-sellers list. It spent four weeks on the list.

== Reception ==
Edward Luce of the Financial Times praised the book, saying the authors "do a great job of showing how 'safetyism' is cramping young minds." Writing for The New York Times, Thomas Chatterton Williams praised the book's explanations and analysis of recent college campus trends as "compelling". Historian Niall Ferguson and journalist Conor Friedersdorf also gave the book positive reviews.

Writing for The Washington Post, Michael S. Roth, president of Wesleyan University, gave the book a mixed review. He questioned the book's assertion that students today are "disempowered because they've been convinced they are fragile" but said that the authors' "insights on the dangers of creating habits of 'moral dependency' are timely and important."

Moira Weigel, writing for The Guardian, observed in the authors an "elite liberal" position. As Weigel noticed, as a result of a "leftward surge lifting Bernie Sanders and Alexandria Ocasio-Cortez", "a growing number of white men who hold power in historically liberal institutions" "implicitly expressed frustration at how web platforms were breaking up their monopoly on discourse", and reacted by dismissing online movements as clicktivism or hashtags. "Enjoying the luxury of living free from discrimination and domination, they therefore insist that the crises moving young people to action are all in their heads."

Why are you making such a big deal about identity, Lukianoff and Haidt ask again and again, of people whose identities, fixed to their bodies by centuries of law and bureaucracy and custom, make them vastly more likely to be poor or raped, or killed by the police, or deep in debt. Seize the data! But not all kinds of data.

To Weigel, "The core irony of The Coddling of the American Mind is that, by opposing identity politics, its authors try to consolidate an identity that does not have to see itself as such." "In their safe space of TED talks and thinktanks and think pieces, the genteel crusaders against 'political correctness'" - i.e. Haidt and Lukianoff - "create their own speech codes. [...] The minds they coddle just may be their own."

== Film ==
A documentary film, The Coddling of the American Mind, based on the ideas in the book, was released on the Substack platform. An interview with the filmmakers discusses the film and its relationship to the book.

== See also ==
- The Closing of the American Mind
- Diversity, equity, and inclusion#Effects on free speech and academic freedom
- iGen (book)
- The "Me" Decade and the Third Great Awakening
