= The Closing of the American Mind =

1987 book by Allan Bloom

- Cover of the first edition
- Author: Allan Bloom
- Language: English
- Subject: Higher education
- Publisher: Simon & Schuster
- Publication date: February 1987
- Publication place: United States
- Media type: Print (hardcover and paperback)
- Pages: 392
- ISBN: 978-5-551-86868-2
- Dewey Decimal: 378.0120973
- LC Class: LA227.3

The Closing of the American Mind: How Higher Education Has Failed Democracy and Impoverished the Souls of Today's Students is a 1987 book by the philosopher Allan Bloom, in which the author criticizes the openness of relativism, in academia and society in general, as leading paradoxically to the great closing referenced in the book's title. In Bloom's view, openness undermines critical thinking and eliminates the point of view that defines cultures. The book became an unexpected best seller, eventually selling close to half a million copies in hardback.

== Summary ==
Bloom critiques contemporary higher education in the United States and how he sees it is failing its students, criticizing modern movements in philosophy and the humanities. Throughout the book, he attacks the moral relativism that he claims has taken over American universities for the barrier it constructs to the notions of truth, critical thinking, and genuine knowledge. Bloom claims that students in the 1980s have prioritized the immediate, blind relegation of prejudice as inferiority of thought, and therefore have closed their minds, as the title suggests, to asking the right questions, so that prejudice may be eradicated through logic and critical thinking, as opposed to empty, baseless instinct. Bloom writes, "Prejudices, strong prejudices, are visions about the way things are. ... Error is indeed our enemy, but it alone points to the truth and therefore deserves our respectful treatment. The mind that has no prejudices at the outset is empty."

=== "Students" ===
In part one, titled "Students", Bloom details how the young American mindset, the books, music, relationships, and other aspects of American popular culture contribute to the sanctimony of what he perceives to be dull, lazy minds in American universities today. Bloom contends that the "clean slate", with which students enter universities, at first made them more susceptible to genuinely embracing the studies of philosophy and logic. Soon enough, because of "[t]he improved education of the vastly expanded middle class [that] weakened the family's authority", there came a "gradual stilling of the old political and religious echoes" in the students Bloom encountered later in his teaching career. He credits the narrowing and flattening of the American college experience to these phenomena.

Bloom then delves into what he believes is the great books dilemma. He believes that the great books of Western thought have been devalued as a source of wisdom—but more importantly, that "our students have lost the practice of and the taste of reading". Because of this, students are unable to derive their beliefs from evidence, from central texts, or any print source at all. Bloom contends that without an understanding of important older texts, such as Plato's Republic or Niccolò Machiavelli's The Prince, modern students lack any reference point with which they can critically think about or address current events. Students are instead left with vague and abstract ideas of "good" and "evil".

Bloom notes that the "addiction to music" he observes in modern students is unparalleled, and has been for centuries. But even this, he says, contributes to the closing of the young American mind. He notes that fewer and fewer students have a surface level, let alone nuanced, understanding of classical music, and that instead, "rock music is as unquestioned and un-problematic as the air the students breathe." Pop music, he believes, employs sexual images and language to enthrall the young and to persuade them that their petty rebelliousness is authentic politics, when, in fact, they are being controlled by the money-managers whom successful performers like Mick Jagger quietly serve. He regards the ubiquity of overly sexual overtones in 1980s rock music, and what he perceives to be a subsequent corruption of young minds, as a signal of "parents' loss of control over the children's moral education at a time when no one else is seriously concerned with it." Bloom's conclusion about the effects of music on education is that its oversexualization in the late 20th century makes it "very difficult for [students] to have a passionate relationship with the art and thought that are the substance of liberal education, [since] [i]t only artificially induces the exaltation attached to the completion of the greatest endeavors ... like discovery of the truth." Students no longer seek pleasure from the pursuit of learning.

Bloom concludes in "Students" that because of the relationships students have with popular culture, their family, and their peers, they no longer come to university asking questions, seeking instruction, or with imagination.

=== "Nihilism, American Style" ===
Bloom titles the second part of the book "Nihilism, American Style". He introduces in further detail the concept of "value relativism", mentioned previously only in the introduction. Value relativism, he says, plagues most elite institutions of higher learning. For Bloom, this dissolved into nihilism. He notices that students follow the path of least resistance when developing their values. For students, he writes, "values are not discovered by reason, and it is fruitless to seek them, to find the truth or the good life." Ironically, when traveling this path without reason, Bloom writes, students still "adopt strong poses and fanatic resolutions."

Bloom also criticizes his fellow philosophy professors, especially those involved in ordinary language analysis or logical positivism, for disregarding important "humanizing" ethical and political issues and failing to pique the interest of students. Literature professors involved in deconstructionism promote irrationalism and skepticism of standards of truth and thereby dissolve the moral imperatives which are communicated through genuine philosophy and which elevate and broaden the intellects of those who engage with these imperatives. To a great extent, Bloom's critique extends beyond the university to speak to what he characterizes as a general crisis in American society. He draws analogies between the United States and the Weimar Republic. The modern liberal philosophy, he says, enshrined in the Enlightenment thought of John Locke—that a just society could be based upon self-interest alone, coupled by the emergence of relativism in American thought—had led to this crisis. Bloom cites Friedrich Nietzsche's actions of telling "modern man that he was free-falling in the abyss of nihilism", and continues to espouse Nietzsche's commentary that nihilism in our contemporary democracy stems from value relativism.

For Bloom, this created a void in the souls of Americans, into which demagogic radicals as exemplified by 1960s student leaders could leap. (Bloom made the comparison to the Brownshirts of the Nazi Party, who once similarly filled the gap created in German society by the Weimar Republic.) In the second instance, he argued, the higher calling of philosophy and reason understood as freedom of thought, had been eclipsed by a pseudo-philosophy, or an ideology of thought. Relativism was one feature of modern American liberal philosophy that had subverted the Platonic–Socratic teaching.

=== "The University" ===
Bloom contends that the failure of contemporary liberal education leads to the sterile social and sexual habits of modern students, and to their inability to fashion a life for themselves beyond the mundane offerings touted as success. Bloom argues that commercial pursuits have become more highly valued than love, the philosophic quest for truth, or the civilized pursuits of honor and glory. In "The University", he discusses how the environment in elite institutions has cultivated mere ambition over the search for truth. He says that proclaiming an affinity for reason does not alone define a university's worth, as the statement alone does not constitute true commitment to scholastic pursuits in the name of a greater truth. He contends that "the mere announcement of the rule of reason does not create the conditions for the full exercise of rationality". Universities serve as a reflection of the public and democracy at large. Because of this, they are shaped by public opinion (per Alexis de Tocqueville). Public opinion serves as the final gatekeeper and the final headsman for any movements the university may actually try to implement to advance the pursuit of critical thinking.

Bloom also explains what he believes is the dichotomy between the "spirit of the university" and the university itself. "The philosophic life is not the university." He alludes to early philosophers, from Socrates (who he firmly believes to be "the essence of the university" concept) through the nineteenth century, who he claims never made use of such institutions at all. Bloom posits that maybe, after all, free thought and commitment to a greater truth need not exist within the metaphorical four walls of a university. What matters instead, he says, what is "uniquely human", is the "philosophic experience".

Bloom also notices a trend in which students notice the devaluing of free thought in universities. He writes about students at Cornell University, that "these students discerned that their teachers did not really believe that freedom of thought was necessarily a good and useful thing, that they suspected that all this was ideology protecting the injustices of our 'system'". Bloom asserts that American professors in the sixties "were not aware of what they no longer believed" and that this notion gravely endangered any capacity for progress towards free thought. Bloom insists that requiring from universities empty values like "greater openness", "less rigidity", and "freedom from authority" are only fashionable and do not have any substantive content. And in the face of growing civil rights conflicts, universities have a duty to instead actively pursue the task of "opening American minds". It is not enough, Bloom contends, for universities to "not want trouble". It is not enough for universities to only hold reputation paramount in the face of campus disruption, and only in name espouse free thought and truth. This "unfortunate mixture of cowardice and moralism" will unseat the spirit of the university. Bloom concludes by reminding readers that the love of wisdom and truth must be kept alive in universities, particularly in this moment of world history.

== Publication ==
The Closing of the American Mind was published in March 1987, five years after Bloom published an essay in the National Review about the failure of universities to serve the needs of students. With the encouragement of Saul Bellow, his colleague at the University of Chicago, he expanded his thoughts into a book "about a life, I've led" that critically reflected on the current state of higher education in American universities. His friends and admirers imagined the work would be a modest success, as did Bloom, who recognized his publisher's modest advance to complete the project as a lack of sales confidence. Yet on the momentum of strong initial reviews, including one by Christopher Lehmann-Haupt in The New York Times and an op-ed piece by syndicated conservative commentator George Will entitled "A How-To Book for the Independent" it became an unexpected best seller, eventually selling close to half a million copies in hardback and remaining at number one on The New York Times Non-fiction Best Seller list for four months.

== Reception ==
The Closing of the American Mind was met with mixed reviews from scholars and the general public alike.

=== Positive ===
The art critic Roger Kimball wrote in The New York Times that Bloom's work should not be diminished publicly simply because it is not optimistic. Instead, he writes, "'The Closing of the American Mind' is essential reading for anyone concerned with the state of liberal education in this society. Its pathos, erudition and penetrating insight make it an unparalleled reflection on the whole question of what it means to be a student in today's intellectual and moral climate." He concludes that,

Mr. Bloom paints a sobering if not, alas, entirely unfamiliar picture. ... [O]ne of the chief things to appreciate about "The Closing of the American Mind" is that its dominant stance is interrogative, not prescriptive. Everything problematic that the term modernity implies, all the doubts about the meaning of tradition, the legitimacy of inherited values, the point of preserving high culture—all this Mr. Bloom is perfectly cognizant of.

Matt Feeney from The New Yorker also wrote in his article, "Allan Bloom's Guide to College", in 2012, that while Bloom's core arguments may have been diluted into trite conservative barbs directed at liberal educations, the essence of his argument remains true today, and his motives do too. He explains that by writing The Closing of the American Mind, "Bloom dangles the promise of an arousing and dangerous philosophical quest, which will take the student far from his (and his friends' and parents' and other professors') settled opinions about what is good and decent." As for Bloom's impact on this era of politics, Feeney suggests a reframe in the way consumers perceive Bloom's work. Feeney writes,

Bloom's light, urgent prose makes it easy to forget how audacious this chapter is in its depth, breadth, and seriousness, and how defiant it is in its defense of liberal education. Bloom's knee-jerk opponents tend to be leftists, but these people are merely symptoms of a deeper modern distrust of liberal learning. It might be better, then, to reframe Bloom's project, from a secretly erotic quest for sublime knowledge to an existentially urgent battle for nonconformity; real weirdness in a world that wants to co-opt everything, make everything productive for and comprehensible to everyone.

The neoconservative writer Norman Podhoretz embraced Bloom's argument, noting that the closed-mindedness in his title refers to the paradoxical consequence of the academic "open mind" found in liberal political thought—namely "the narrow and intolerant dogmatism" that dismisses any attempt, by Plato or the Hebrew Bible for example, to provide a rational basis for moral judgments. Podhoretz continued, "Bloom goes on to charge liberalism with vulgarizing the noble ideals of freedom and equality, and he offers brilliantly acerbic descriptions of the sexual revolution and the feminist movement, which he sees as products of this process of vulgarization." Bloom's work was also supported by a larger conservative movement. In 2005, Jim Sleeper wrote for The New York Times that "nothing prepared [conservatives'] movement, or the academic and publishing worlds, for the wildfire success of [the book]. ... Conservatives championed Bloom then, of course, and they invoke him still."

In a 1989 article, Ann Clark Fehn discussed the critical reception of the book, noting that it had eclipsed other titles that year dealing with higher education (College by Ernest L. Boyer and Cultural Literacy by E. D. Hirsch), and quoting Publishers Weekly, which had described Bloom's book as a "bestseller made by reviews". The poet Frederick Turner described The Closing of the American Mind as, "The most thoughtful conservative analysis of the nation's cultural sickness."

The critic Camille Paglia called The Closing of the American Mind "the first shot in the culture wars", writing of Bloom that she was "confident that in the long run he will be vindicated and his critics swallowed in obscurity".

=== Negative ===
In her review, Martha Nussbaum questioned whether Bloom deserved to be considered a philosopher. The criticism of the book was continued by impassioned reviews by Benjamin Barber in Harper's; by Alexander Nehamas in the London Review of Books; and by David Rieff in The Times Literary Supplement. David Rieff called Bloom "an academic version of Lieut. Col. Oliver L. North: vengeful, reactionary, antidemocratic." The book, he said, was one that "decent people would be ashamed of having written." The tone of these reviews led James Atlas in The New York Times Magazine to conclude "the responses to Bloom's book have been charged with a hostility that transcends the usual mean-spiritedness of reviewers."

William Greider wrote for Rolling Stone that there were two main reasons for the roaring commercial success of Bloom's work. The first, he says, is purely due to the "impassioned quality of Bloom's prose. The professor's rhetoric is laced with high-blown discourses on his great-books heroes and his enemies list ... The average reader is undoubtedly flattered by Bloom's intellectual name-dropping; it's always fun to be high-minded about someone else's ignorance." According to Greider, the second reason behind Bloom's success is timing. He writes that "the book's appearance coincides with a surge of national concern about the disappearance of traditional education. Another current best seller, Cultural Literacy, by E.D. Hirsch Jr., also taps the same anxieties." Ultimately, Greider concludes that Bloom's agenda is simply a vicious attack on the values of young America. He writes,

Bloom's real agenda is much darker—to launch a nasty, reactionary attack on the values of young people and everyone else under forty. His multi-count indictment is a laundry list of cheap slanders made to sound vaguely authoritative, because, after all, Bloom is a teacher who supposedly hangs out with students. In fact, Bloom sounds bewildered by young people—and strangely out of touch with them.

For Greider, it is unfathomable how Bloom could revile the decline in prejudice and relegate that decline to a lack of imagination. He concludes, "Bloom apparently detests the young."

=== Legacy ===
The jurist Richard Posner compared Bloom's book to Paglia's Sexual Personae (1990), finding both books to be examples of "difficult academic works that mysteriously strike a chord with a broad public." Thus, since publication, The Closing of the American Mind fueled many impassioned debates about the state of culture in America. In retaliation the American historian Lawrence W. Levine wrote The Opening of the American Mind. According to The New York Times' Edward Rothstein, Levine's work, published ten full years later, still found it relevant to "praise what Bloom condemned and condemn what he praised." But where, initially, political conservatives espoused Bloom's theories and liberals disavowed them, things seemed to be changing. According to Rothstein, ten years later, in 1997, the lines between supporter and opponent were no longer so clear. He found that, "many conservatives have no problem with diversity if it is accompanied by rigor; many liberals have no problem with rigor if it is accompanied by diversity. And the view that something is amiss in contemporary culture is becoming increasingly widespread." Ultimately, Rothstein concludes, Bloom's work has very little to do "with current political demarcations."

Conversely, Jerry Aaron Snyder of The New Republic argues that the culture wars, which Bloom's work clearly helped spark a conversation about, will consistently be relevant. While it may be argued that The Closing of the American Mind may not resign itself to a political party, this does not preclude it from the impact it had on the culture wars, and how those culture wars shape life today. Snyder argues that books like Bloom's have inspired further conversations and controversies alike, such as controversy surrounding how history is taught in high schools, or the effectiveness of affirmative action or identity politics. According to Snyder, the discussions spawned by the initial culture wars in the 1980s because of books like Bloom's, "'the soul of America' is a bottomless well. For better or worse, it will never run dry."

== See also ==
- The Coddling of the American Mind (2018) – another bestseller with related title
- The Bell Curve (1994) – another bestseller with controversial reception primarily in conservative circles
