= Lee Brooks =

American composer & sound designer (born 1983)

- Born: Lee Raymond Brooks; February 26, 1983 (age 42)
- Origin: Acton, Massachusetts, U.S.
- Genres: Film scores
- Occupations: Composer, sound designer, music producer
- Instruments: Woodwind, keyboard, guitar
- Labels: LeeBrooksMedia & PCM Publishing
- Website: www.leebrooksmedia.com

Lee Raymond Brooks (born February 26, 1983, in Acton, Massachusetts, U.S.) is a composer and sound designer for film.

== Biography ==
Lee Brooks is a composer for stage, film and television. He has scored original music and created sound design for a variety of films, working with talent such as Isabella Rossellini, Kronos Quartet, Ethel and the Czech Philharmonic Chamber Orchestra. His work was recognized by the Student Academy Awards (This is not a Picture), and by the Mid-Atlantic Film Festival for Best Dramatic Score (Empty).

Since 2009, he has composed music for the Oslo Freedom Forum, a conference about human rights with an "ongoing campaign to defend and promote human freedom around the world." In 2009, he scored the theme to open the conference and introduce speakers. For 2010, in addition to a new version of the theme, he was commissioned to write his second and third string quartets, recorded by Ethel and presented during the conference.

He has worked as a Music Producer at Grey Advertising in New York since 2007.

== Credits ==
=== Filmography ===
The following list consists of select films for which Brooks provided the sound design, score and/or songs. Those films for which he provided sound design are in bold.

2000s

- Outside the Box (2002)
- The Rub (2002)
- Janey's Curse (2003)
- One Moment, One Day (2003)
- Sidestreet (2003) - Theme Song "Down She Goes"
- Something and Denodra (2003) - Arrangement of song "Man Out There"
- My Big, Fat Martian Wedding (2004)
- NYU Tonight News Theme (2004)
- This is not a Picture (2004)
- AfterWords (2005)
- **The Bet** (2005)
- **Brake** (2005)
- Bummed (2005)
- A Burlap Christmas (2006)
- Empty (2005)
- Oswald Cornelius' Last One-Night Stand (2005)
- The Time Machine (2006)
- The Wrath of Norm Polanski (2006)
- **Always the Nice Ones** (2007)
- Film School (2007)
- **The Morning After** (2007)
- 2081 (2009)
- Dead Fish (2008)
- **Flat Love** (2008)
- Holy Sapien (2008)

=== Music videos ===
2000s

- "Check, Please" by Lee Brooks (2003) – actor

=== Stage ===
2000s

- A Concert of Original Works (2005)
- A Chance to Breathe (2004) Performed by NASHA (Indian Fusion Dance Troupe)
- SEX: a.k.a. Wieners & Boobs (2004) NYC Stage Production of play by Joe Lo Truglio, Michael Showalter, and David Wain
- Lee Brooks: Presenting His Works for Stage and Screen (2005)
