= Greg Lukianoff =

American free speech advocate

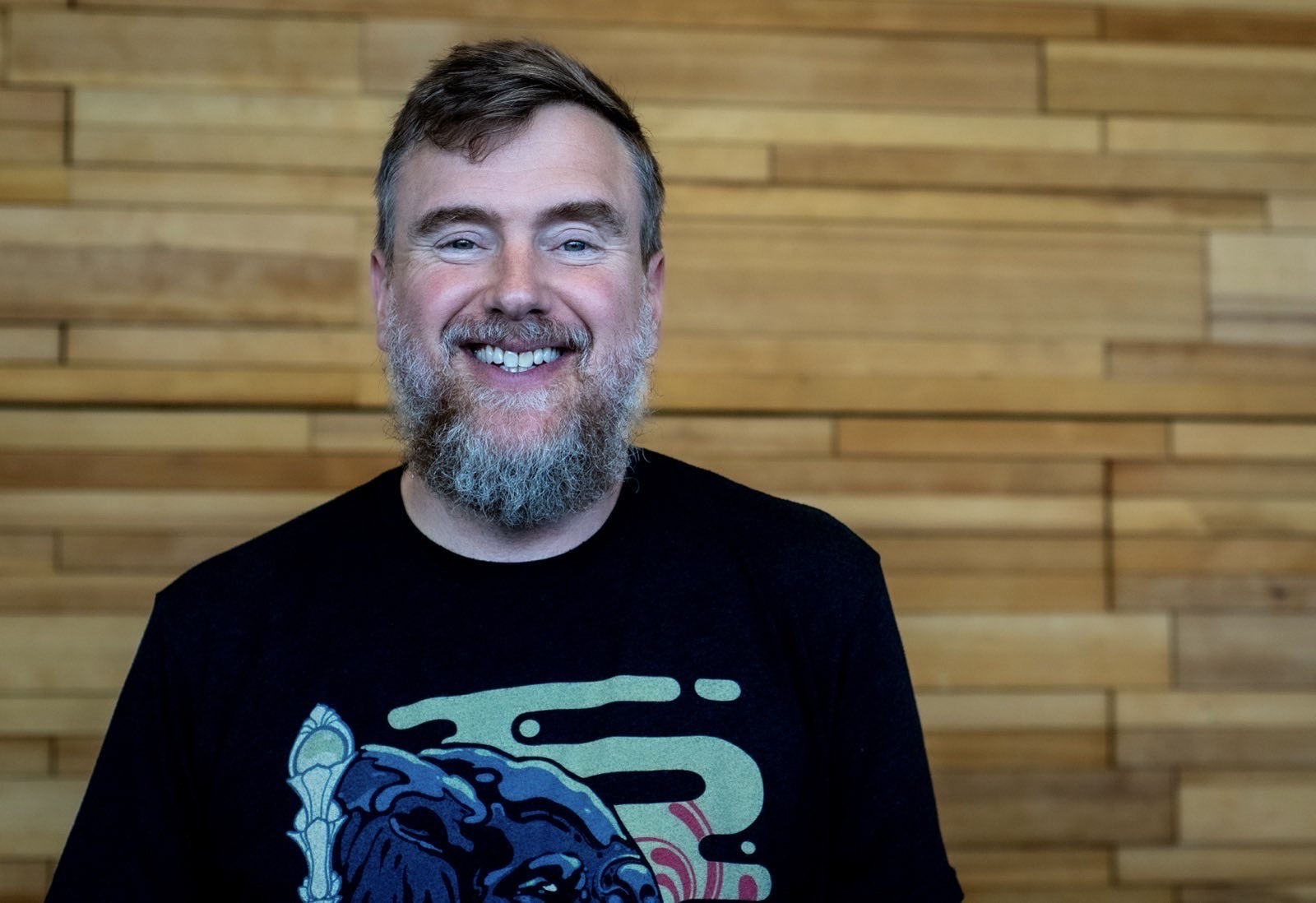
- Lukianoff at TED 2025
- Born: 1974 (age 51–52); New York City, New York, U.S.
- Education: American University (BA); Stanford University (JD)
- Notable work: The Coddling of the American Mind (2018)
- Title: President of the Foundation for Individual Rights and Expression
- Spouse: Michelle LaBlanc (m. 2012; div. 2025)
- Children: 2
- Awards: Hugh M. Hefner First Amendment Award (2019)

Gregory Christopher Lukianoff (/ˌluːkˈjɑːnɒf/; born 1974) is an American lawyer, journalist, author and activist who serves as the president of the Foundation for Individual Rights and Expression (FIRE). He previously served as FIRE's first director of legal and public advocacy until he was appointed president in 2006.

== Early life and education ==
Lukianoff was born in Manhattan, New York City, in 1974. He graduated from American University and then Stanford Law School, where he obtained a Juris Doctor (J.D.) in 2000. As a law student, he focused on constitutional law and the First Amendment, and developed an interest in free speech. He interned with the American Civil Liberties Union (ACLU) in California.

== Career ==
Lukianoff has published articles in the Los Angeles Times, The Boston Globe, The Chronicle of Higher Education, The Atlantic, Inside Higher Ed, and the New York Post. His article in The Atlantic, "The Coddling of the American Mind," discussed whether trigger warnings are harming college health. He is a blogger for The Huffington Post and served as a regular columnist for the Daily Journal of Los Angeles and San Francisco. Along with Harvey Silverglate and David A. French, Lukianoff is a co-author of FIRE's Guide to Free Speech on Campus.

He testified before the United States Congress on the state of free speech on college campuses, and he appeared in the films Brainwashing 101 and Indoctrinate U on the same topic. He has made numerous appearances on nationally syndicated news broadcasts, such as CNN and Fox News.

He has also appeared on various other shows, including Stossel on more than one occasion. Before joining FIRE, Lukianoff interned with the American Civil Liberties Union of Northern California and the Organization for Aid to Refugees, and was a development coordinator for the EnvironMentors Project. He lives in Washington, D.C.

Lukianoff and his co-author Jonathan Haidt were awarded the Hugh M. Hefner First Amendment Award in 2019 for their book The Coddling of the American Mind. In 2021 Lukianoff coined the term Weimar Fallacy in reference to the idea that too much free speech was the true cause of the horrors of Nazi Germany and the Holocaust. Lukianoff noted of the Weimar Republic government's campaign of widespread shutdown of Nazi newspapers that: "in a two-year period, they shut down 99 in Prussia alone — but they accelerated that crackdown on speech as the Nazis ascended to power. Hitler himself was banned from speaking in several German states from 1925 until 1927."

He served as an executive producer for Can We Take a Joke?, a 2015 documentary about self-censorship and cultural awareness in comedy, as well as a 2020 documentary about former ACLU executive director Ira Glasser called Mighty Ira.

== Personal life ==
Lukianoff married Michelle LaBlanc in 2012. Their oldest son, Benjamin, was born circa 2015, followed by a second son, Maxwell, in 2017. Lukianoff and LaBlanc were divorced in 2025.

== Works ==
- Lukianoff, Greg (2014). Unlearning Liberty: Campus Censorship and the End of American Debate. Encounter Books. ISBN 9781594037306.
- Lukianoff, Greg (2014). Freedom from Speech. Encounter Books. ISBN 9781594038075.
- Lukianoff, Greg; Haidt, Jonathan (2018). The Coddling of the American Mind: How Good Intentions and Bad Ideas Are Setting Up a Generation for Failure. New York City: Penguin Press. ISBN 9780735224896.
- Lukianoff, Greg; Schlott, Rikki (2023). The Canceling of the American Mind: How Cancel Culture Undermines Trust, Destroys Institutions, and Threatens Us All. Simon & Schuster. ISBN 978-1668019146.
