= Edward Cline =

American novelist

- Born: October 22, 1946; Pittsburgh, Pennsylvania, U.S.
- Died: 2023 (aged 76–77)
- Occupations: Author; novelist; writer; essayist; blogger
- Writing career
- Years active: 1972–2019
- Genres: Historical fiction; detective fiction; politics
- Notable work: Sparrowhawk series

Edward Cline (October 22, 1946 – 2023) was an American novelist and essayist. An Objectivist, he was best known for his Sparrowhawk series of novels, which were set in England and Virginia before the American Revolutionary War. He also wrote numerous detective novels, and was noted as a critic of Islam on his blog The Rules of Reason.

== Background ==
Cline was born in Pittsburgh, Pennsylvania, and attended South Texas Junior College. He served in the U.S. Air Force from 1964 to 1965. He was active as a writer from 1972, and worked numerous different jobs, including in "factories, construction, airline and publishing communications, inventory management, banking, computer sales, insurance, and as a computer screen designer, book editor, copyeditor, and proofreader."

== Books and writing ==
Apart from the Sparrowhawk series, (Note: Reviews of novels in the Sparrowhawk series: "SPARROWHAWK: Book One: Jack Frake". Publishers Weekly. November 12, 2001. Archived from the original on May 10, 2024.; "SPARROWHAWK, BOOK I, JACK FRAKE". Kirkus Reviews. October 1, 2001. Archived from the original on May 10, 2024.; "SPARROWHAWK, BOOK TWO: Hugh Kenrick". Publishers Weekly. October 28, 2002. Archived from the original on October 7, 2024.; "SPARROWHAWK BOOK IV: Empire". Publishers Weekly. November 15, 2003. Archived from the original on October 8, 2024.) Cline's other fiction included a contemporary detective series (featuring Chess Hanrahan, who solves paradoxical murders), (Note: Reviews of novels in the Chess Hanrahan series: MacDonald, Ken (March 10, 1988). "BOOK REVIEW: FIRST PRIZE by Edward Cline". The Pittsburgh Press. p. B6 – via Google Books.; "First Prize". Publishers Weekly. April 1, 1988. Archived from the original on December 3, 2024.; Gross, John (May 6, 1988). "Books of the Times; Murder Spans the Decades in Tales of Suspense". The New York Times. Archived from the original on May 11, 2024.; McDonald, Cherokee Paul (June 12, 1988). "FIRST PRIZE. By Edward Cline. Mysterious Press". Fort Lauderdale News. p. 78 – via Newspapers.com.; "With Distinction: A Chess Hanrahan Novel". Publishers Weekly. March 12, 2012. Archived from the original on December 3, 2024.) a suspense series (featuring American entrepreneur Merritt Fury), and a period detective series (featuring Cyrus Skeen in 1920s San Francisco).

Cline was also known for his writings on aesthetics, his defenses of capitalism and of free speech, and his criticisms of contemporary political trends and of Islam (and religion in general). As a writer, his strongest influence was the novelist Ayn Rand and her philosophy of Objectivism. Cline wrote on freedom of speech and censorship issues for The Encyclopedia of Library and Information Science and The Journal of Information Ethics. He wrote feature and cover stories, as well as book reviews, for Marine Corps League Magazine, The Colonial Williamsburg Journal, The Wall Street Journal, and The Intellectual Activist. His article on English political philosopher John Locke was carried in two editions of Western Civilization (McGraw-Hill). He wrote the Rules of Reason blog, and his columns also appeared in Capitalism Magazine, Family Security Matters, and other blog sites. He also wrote a "counter-jihad handbook" about Islam.

In May 2016, Cline was informed by the FBI that his name was on a list of over 8,000 names that was characterized as an Islamic State of Iraq and Syria (ISIS) kill list. Cline's landlord promptly evicted him from his Williamsburg, Virginia apartment. In an interview with Vocativ Cline said, "The situation is unprecedented in my lifetime experience. I've never before been evicted or thrown under the bus for what I think and write." According to Vocativ, Cline had "spent the last 15 years raging against Islam and the existential threat he believes it poses to western civilization." A fundraising in support of Cline raised more than $14,000, after his story was covered by online outlets such as FrontPage Magazine and Gates of Vienna.

Cline is reported to have died in 2023.

== Bibliography ==
=== Sparrowhawk series ===
- Sparrowhawk One: Jack Frake, MacAdam/Cage Publishing, 2001, ISBN 1-931561-00-1
- Sparrowhawk Two: Hugh Kenrick MacAdam/Cage Publishing, 2002 ISBN 1-931561-20-6
- Sparrowhawk Three: Caxton, MacAdam/Cage Publishing, 2004, ISBN 1-931561-53-2
- Sparrowhawk Four: Empire, MacAdam/Cage Publishing, 2004, ISBN 1-931561-87-7
- Sparrowhawk Five: Revolution, MacAdam/Cage, 2005, ISBN 1-59692-154-4
- Sparrowhawk Six: War, MacAdam/Cage, 2007, ISBN 1-59692-198-6
- Sparrowhawk Companion (in collaboration with Jena Trammell, editor), MacAdam/Cage, 2008, ISBN 978-1-59692-261-7

=== Chess Hanrahan series ===
- First Prize, Chess Hanrahan, #1, Mysterious Press/Warner Book, 1988, ISBN 0-89296-291-7
- Presence of Mind, Chess Hanrahan, #2, Perfect Crime Books, 2010, ISBN 978-0-9825157-0-9
- Honors Due, Chess Hanrahan, #3, Perfect Crime Books, 2011, ISBN 978-1-935797-14-2
- With Distinction, Chess Hanrahan, #4, Perfect Crime Books, 2012, ISBN 978-1-935797-21-0

=== Merritt Fury series ===
- Whisper the Guns, Merritt Fury, #1 Atlantean Press, 1992, ISBN 0-9626854-2-9
- We Three Kings, Merritt Fury, #2, Atlantean Press, 1994, ISBN 978-0962685453
- Run From Judgment, Merritt Fury, #3, Patrick Henry Press, 2012, ISBN 978-148-1248709

=== Cyrus Skeen series ===
- China Basin, Cyrus Skeen, #1, Patrick Henry Press, 2011, ISBN 978-1481182201
- The Head of Athena, Cyrus Skeen, #2, Patrick Henry Press, 2012, ISBN 978-1481202466
- The Daedâlus Conspiracy, Cyrus Skeen, #3, Patrick Henry Press, 2012, ISBN 978-1481208772
- The Chameleon, Cyrus Skeen, #4, Patrick Henry Press, 2012, ISBN 978-1481212625
- A Crimson Overture, Cyrus Skeen, #5, Patrick Henry Press, 2013, ISBN 978-1492251972
- The Black Stone, Cyrus Skeen, #6, Patrick Henry Press, 2014, ISBN 978-1494974626
- The Pickwick Affair, Cyrus Skeen, #7, Patrick Henry Press, 2014, ISBN 978-1500217167
- Silver Screens, Cyrus Skeen, #8, Patrick Henry Press, 2015, ISBN 978-1508772019
- The Circles of Odin, Cyrus Skeen, #9, Patrick Henry Press, 2015, ISBN 978-1511441599
- Sleight of Hand, Cyrus Skeen, #10, Patrick Henry Press, 2015, ISBN 978-1511786881
- Stolen Words, Cyrus Skeen, #11, Patrick Henry Press, 2015, ISBN 978-1514248706
- An August Interlude, Cyrus Skeen, #12, Patrick Henry Press, 2015, ISBN 978-1516876051
- Wintery Discontent, Cyrus Skeen, #13, Patrick Henry Press, 2015 ISBN 978-1517491505
- Manhattan Blues, Cyrus Skeen, #14, Patrick Henry Press, 2016 ISBN 978-1523381814
- The Janus Affair, Cyrus Skeen, #15, Patrick Henry Press, 2016 ISBN 978-1530042562
- First Things, Cyrus Skeen, #16, Patrick Henry Press, 2016 ISBN 978-1530496273
- Civic Affairs, Cyrus Skeen, #17, Patrick Henry Press, 2016 ISBN 978-1530849468
- Exegesis, Cyrus Skeen, #18, Patrick Henry Press, 2016 ISBN 978-1533003478
- Seeing Double, Cyrus Skeen, #19, Patrick Henry Press, 2016 ISBN 978-1537136288
- Trichotomy, Cyrus Skeen, #20, Patrick Henry Press, 2016 ISBN 978-1537649535
- Beginnings, Cyrus Skeen, #21, Patrick Henry Press, 2016 ISBN 978-1539699354
- Reciprocity, Cyrus Skeen, #22, Patrick Henry Press, 2016 ISBN 978-1530496273
- Saving Athena, Cyrus Skeen, #23, Patrick Henry Press, 2017 ISBN 978-1541389830
- Split Infinitives, Cyrus Skeen, #24, Patrick Henry Press, 2017 ISBN 978-1542843089
- Passions, Cyrus Skeen, #25, Patrick Henry Press, 2017 ISBN 978-1544251967
- Celebrity News, Cyrus Skeen, #26, Patrick Henry Press, 2017 ISBN 978-1544903026
- Inquest, Cyrus Skeen, #27, Patrick Henry Press, 2017 ISBN 978-1546836230
- Double Entendre, Cyrus Skeen, #28, Patrick Henry Press, 2017 ISBN 978-1974664009
- Sufferance, Cyrus Skeen, #29, Patrick Henry Press, 2017 ISBN 978-1976594854
- Warlocks, Cyrus Skeen, #30, Patrick Henry Press, 2017
- The Skeen Chronicles, Cyrus Skeen, #31, Patrick Henry Press, 2017 ISBN 978-1979109109
- Reprisals, Cyrus Skeen Detective, #32, Patrick Henry Press, 2017 ISBN 978-1979435604
- The Pendulum, Cyrus Skeen, #33, Patrick Henry Press, 2017 ISBN 978-1981342969
- School Days, Cyrus Skeen, #34, Patrick Henry Press, 2018 ISBN 978-1983486142
- Breakdown, Cyrus Skeen, #36, Patrick Henry Press, 2018
- The Gumshoe Guild, Cyrus Skeen, #37, Patrick Henry Press, 2018 ISBN 978-1986064071
- Serenity, Cyrus Skeen, #38, Patrick Henry Press, 2018 ISBN 978-1987639087
- Chicago Serenade, Cyrus Skeen, #39, Patrick Henry Press, 2018 ISBN 978-1724231536
- Flute, Cyrus Skeen, #40, Patrick Henry Press, 2018 ISBN 978-1727871968
- A Final Canvas, Cyrus Skeen, #41, Patrick Henry Press, 2019 ISBN 978-1790771110
- Gallery, Cyrus Skeen, #42, Patrick Henry Press, 2019 ISBN 978-1795164436

=== The War of Ideas series ===
- Running Out My Guns, The War of Ideas, #1, Patrick Henry Press, 2012, ISBN 978-1481810067
- Broadsides in the War of Ideas, The War of Ideas, #2, Patrick Henry Press, 2012, ISBN 978-1481800792
- Corsairs and Freebooters, The War of Ideas, #3, Patrick Henry Press, 2012, ISBN 978-1481804509
- Boarding Parties & Grappling Hooks, The War of Ideas, #4, Patrick Henry Press, 2013, ISBN 978-1482087833
- Letters of Marque, The War of Ideas, #5, Patrick Henry Press, 2013, ISBN 978-1493749034
- From The Crow's Nest, The War of Ideas, #6, Patrick Henry Press, 2014, ISBN 978-1499690620

=== Other works ===
- The Wizards of Disambiguation: A Critique of Detective Genre Literary Criticism, Atlantean Press Review, 1993
- Islam's Reign of Terror, Patrick Henry Press/Voltaire Press, 2014, ISBN 978-1500920777
- Rational Scrutiny: Paradoxes and Contradictions in Detective Fiction, Patrick Henry Press, 2014, ISBN 978-1500848903
- Handbook on Islam: A Counter-Jihad Guide for the Uninitiated, the Ill-Advised the Misinformed, and the Lied-To, CreateSpace, 2015, ISBN 978-1512315318
- Cogitations: Recent Reflections on the State of Things, Patrick Henry Press, 2015 ISBN 978-1517267377
- Routing Islam, Patrick Henry Press, 2016 ISBN 978-1539426868
- Collectables, Patrick Henry Press, 2018 ISBN 978-1-7271-5539-6
- The Ghouls of Grammatical Egalitarianism, Patrick Henry Press, 2019 ISBN 978-1798103388
