= Young invincibles =

Trade term for young Americans who forgo health insurance

Members of the United States population between the ages of 18 and 29 who decide that it is in their financial best interest to forgo health insurance are sometimes referred to as young invincibles by the insurance industry, a term coined to express the idea that the young demographic perceives themselves as immune to sickness and injury. The argument is that these individuals are young and in good health, so they have a low risk of experiencing substantial health issues that would lead to large amounts of spending on health care. Further, this group tends to have a mentality of “it won’t happen to me” with regards to most causes of injury. Together, these beliefs lead to the young invincibles not purchasing insurance.

== Insurance market effects ==
There are risks associated with the young invincibles choosing to operate outside of the health insurance market, stemming from the economic phenomenon of adverse selection. Adverse selection is a principle describing the situation where people purchase insurance based on their expected use. People who anticipate using the most medical services purchase the most generous insurance plans, while people who do not expect to use many medical services are inclined not to purchase insurance at all.

Due to the risk-spreading design of insurance, the adverse selection associated with the young invincibles leads to higher premiums for people who choose to purchase health insurance. As insurance premiums rise, more healthy people decide that it is not worth the higher prices, and drop out of the market, leading to what is called the "adverse selection death spiral." By contrast, if young adults purchase insurance but continue to utilize very little health care services, the money they pay in premiums can go towards support the expenditures of people utilizing many health care services.

== The Affordable Care Act and young adults ==
This problem of ballooning health insurance premiums has persisted for years, and was important in the debate over the Patient Protection and Affordable Care Act, commonly called the Affordable Care Act (ACA). One set of ACA provisions eliminated the insurance industry's ability to charge different premiums to people with differing health status and the ability to exclude individuals with pre-existing conditions. Implemented alone, these provisions would greatly increase the risk in the health insurance market, and premiums would increase to cover associated increases in expenditure. Therefore, the ACA includes a number of provisions aimed at incentivizing young invincibles to enter into the health insurance market.

Individual mandate. The individual mandate applies to young adults and young adults may be eligible for a premium tax credit, lowering or eliminating the cost of insurance. This is particularly significant for young adults because they disproportionately compose those with incomes between 133 and 400% of the Federal Poverty Line who are entering the workforce for the first time. It is estimated that approximately nine million young adults ages 18–34 could be eligible for a subsidy.

Dependent coverage. Legislation requires family insurance plans with dependent coverage to extend this coverage until young adults reach the age of 26. Prior to the ACA, most employer-based health insurance plans stopped dependent coverage when the child turned 18 or 19, or had graduated from college. Effective September 23, 2010, young adults can join or remain on their parents’ insurance plans even if they are married, not living with their parents, attending school, financially independent from their parents, or eligible to enroll in an employer's insurance plan. The coverage extension applies to both employer-based and private plans.

Catastrophic coverage. Adults who are under the age of 30 and have experienced certain hardship may qualify for a cheaper “catastrophic” health plan. The catastrophic health plan is meant to protect young adults from very high medical costs. Purchased through the Exchanges, the plan covers three primary care visits per year at no cost to the individual and covers free preventive services. Reasons for exemption vary, such as homelessness or experience of domestic violence, and some require documented proof, such as an eviction or foreclosure notice. However, regardless of income, young adults must pay the standard price for the catastrophic plan (i.e., individuals purchasing these plans are not eligible for lower monthly premiums or lower out-of-pocket costs based on income).

Other provisions. Many other ACA provisions are also relevant to young adults and effectively encourage young adults to buy insurance:

· The expansion of Medicaid, if universally adopted, could cover nearly 7.8 million young adults under the age of 35. As of December 11, 2013, 25 states and the District of Columbia planned to expand their Medicaid programs beginning in 2014.

· As with other individuals, young adults cannot be denied health coverage due to a pre-existing condition.

== Challenges to enrollment ==
The White House faces the challenge of proving the value of health insurance to at least 2.7 million young invincibles who have historically been under-represented in the insurance pool.

Many studies reporting on this effort conclude that insurance may be too great an expense and provide too little benefit to healthy young adults, making them willing to pay the penalty instead. Analysis suggests that healthy young adults who opt out of insurance could spend an average of five times less on health care than those who sign up for insurance. Another barrier to enrolling young adults is political or ideological opposition to the ACA. As health care reform under the ACA is closely associated with the Obama Administration and the Democratic Party, some young Americans may base their support on political affiliation. Political groups opposed to reform have developed campaigns encouraging young adults to refrain from purchasing insurance in the Marketplaces. One example is Generation Opportunity’s digital and grassroots “Opt-Out” initiative.

Efforts to enroll young adults were impeded as this subset of the population and people across the United States had great difficulty in accessing and using Healthcare.gov (the site intended to help people enroll in the Federally Facilitated Exchange) during the initial enrollment launch in 2013.

== Outreach and enrollment strategies ==
Campaigns. Leading up to and throughout the first annual enrollment period, health insurance Marketplaces and advocacy groups released social media and other forms of campaigns. Many of these campaigns were aimed at encouraging young adults in particular to sign up for insurance. Examples include Covered California’s “Tell a Friend - Get Covered” and “Got Insurance,” a project of the Colorado Consumer Health Initiative and ProgressNow Colorado. Maryland's Maryland Health Connection partnered with 2013 Super Bowl champions, the Baltimore Ravens, to connect with residents on the importance of developing a “health coverage game plan.” The American Association of Retired Persons (AARP) developed a series of e-cards for parents to send to their children as a reminder to sign up before the enrollment deadline.

Celebrity endorsements. Celebrities including pop icon Lady Gaga, singers Adam Levine and John Legend, and actresses Olivia Wilde and Amy Poehler, have shown public support for the ACA and Marketplace enrollment via Twitter and other social media outlets.

National Youth Enrollment Day. A National Youth Enrollment Day launched on February 15, 2014. The initiative was led by the non-profits Young Invincibles and Get Covered America.

== Enrollment figures (2013-2014) ==
Federally facilitated exchange.

Initial enrollment data from the Department of Health and Human Services show that young adults are signing up for plans in the Federally facilitated Exchange. Numbers from the first quarter of Marketplace activity (October 1, 2013 to December 28, 2013) demonstrated that nearly one-quarter (24%) of the population who had selected a Marketplace plan were between the ages of 18 and 34, reflective of the proportion of young adults making up the same age group in the general population. An eight-fold increase was observed in the cumulative number of 18- to 34-year-olds who signed up for a marketplace plan in the last month of the reported period. At the same time, the Commonwealth Fund's Affordable Care Act Tracking Study revealed that 41% of visitors to Marketplaces were between the ages of 19 and 34, suggesting that overall enrollment numbers would continue to increase as the March 31, 2014 deadline approached.

State Marketplaces.

At the state level, initial Marketplace enrollment data for young adults generally reflected that of the Federally facilitated Exchange. Most states reported 21-27% participation by this key age group. States at lower extremes included Arkansas, Arizona and New Mexico, with initial enrollment rates by young adults hovering between 17 and 18%. Massachusetts and the District of Columbia are among those reporting higher initial rates of enrollment by young adults, at 31% and 43%, respectively.
