= American Film Renaissance =

Defunct conservative film festival

- Location: United States
- Established: September 9, 2004; 21 years ago
- Founded by: Jim Hubbard; Ellen Hubbard
- Website: www.afrfilmfestival.com

American Film Renaissance (AFR) was a non-profit film institute best known for hosting the United States' first conservative/libertarian film festival, held annually, primarily in Washington, D.C., until 2008.

== Festival ==
AFR was founded by husband and wife duo Jim and Ellen Hubbard, both attorneys. The Hubbards organized AFR festival after one evening they went to an arthouse cinema and found themselves choosing between Michael Moore's Bowling for Columbine and Frida, a film about Frida Kahlo. According to Jim Hubbard, neither of these films reflected their worldview, which led them to decide to create their own festival.

The first AFR festival premiered in September 2004 in Dallas, Texas, screening 21 movies to 2,500 viewers. AFR also hosted festivals in Hollywood, California, Traverse City, Michigan and Washington, D.C. At its festivals, AFR screened feature films such as The World's Fastest Indian starring Anthony Hopkins and David Zucker’s An American Carol, and documentaries such as The Bituminous Coal Queens of Pennsylvania produced by Patricia Heaton. Films at AFR film festivals were screened at venues such as the Grauman's Chinese Theatre in Los Angeles and The John F. Kennedy Center for the Performing Arts in Washington. Actors who appeared at AFR events included Heaton, Gary Sinise, Robert Davi, and Tony Shalhoub.

In 2007, AFR expanded into documentary film production with their first film Museum of Government Waste, though it was never released, and in 2008, into filmmaker training programs.

== See also ==
- Motion Picture Alliance for the Preservation of American Ideals
