= Primetime (film) =

2026 film by Lance Oppenheim

- Theatrical release poster
- Directed by: Lance Oppenheim
- Written by: Ajon Singh
- Based on: "Tonight on Dateline This Man Will Die" by Luke Dittrich
- Produced by: Brian Kavanaugh-Jones; Fred Berger; William Iannaccone; Robert Pattinson; Brighton McCloskey; Lars Knudsen; Ari Aster
- Starring: Robert Pattinson; Merritt Wever; Skyler Gisondo; Matthew Maher; Phoebe Bridgers
- Cinematography: David Bolen
- Edited by: Daniel Garber
- Music by: Ari Balouzian
- Production companies: A24; Icki Eneo Arlo; Range; Square Peg
- Distributed by: A24
- Release dates: September 5, 2026 (Venice); September 25, 2026 (United States)
- Running time: 109 minutes
- Country: United States
- Language: English
- Budget: $14.5 million
- Box office: $64.3 million

Primetime is a 2026 American psychological crime thriller film (Note: Attributed to multiple references:) written by Ajon Singh and directed by Lance Oppenheim. It dramatizes the production of the reality television series To Catch a Predator (2004–2007); Robert Pattinson portrays its host Chris Hansen, an NBC journalist who works with the vigilante group Perverted-Justice to catch child predators in sting operations. Merritt Wever, Skyler Gisondo, Matthew Maher, and Phoebe Bridgers appear in supporting roles.

Oppenheim, who had previously directed documentaries, conceived Primetime as his first narrative feature film after his wife hired Hansen to record a Cameo video for him in 2024. Singh based the script on Luke Dittrich's 2007 Esquire article "Tonight on Dateline This Man Will Die", which details the botched To Catch a Predator sting operation that culminated in the 2006 suicide of Bill Conradt, and sought to make a stylized retelling rather than a biographical film. Principal photography took place from February to March 2025; cinematographer David Bolen used 12 camera formats, seeking to replicate To Catch a Predator sting operations and digital recordings.

Ari Balouzian composed the soundtrack, including the single "Savior". Balouzian joined Primetime early in its production, beginning work on it before and during filming; Pattinson listened to Balouzian's compositions during filming to help him get into character. Bridgers contributed the single "On Video" to the soundtrack. "On Video" and "Savior" both feature as end credits features for Primetime.

Primetime premiered at the 83rd Venice International Film Festival on September 5, 2026, and was released theatrically by A24 in the United States on September 25. It has grossed $64.3 million against a $14.5 million budget and received positive reviews. Hansen, who was not consulted during the production, criticized it as "detached from reality".

== Plot ==
In 2006, journalist Chris Hansen hosts To Catch a Predator, a Dateline NBC series in which he conducts sting operations with the anti-pedophilia vigilante group Perverted-Justice. They lure would-be child predators, expecting to engage in sex with minors, played by decoy actors of legal age, to houses where Hansen and his camera crew confront them before they are arrested. To Catch a Predator is a ratings success, and NBC's head Jeff Zucker, despite not liking the show, places it in the primetime slot to compete with ABC's hit show Lost.

Dan Plum, an aspiring actor seeking credits for membership in the Screen Actors Guild (SAG), is cast as one of To Catch a Predator's decoys. Although he is initially disturbed by the shooting process, he acclimates and comes to admire Hansen. Hansen breaks off an extramarital affair with a younger woman at a restaurant, unaware he is being photographed. A National Enquirer reporter begins calling Hansen for comment on an upcoming story about the affair.

Disturbed by the threat of his affair going public and under pressure to maintain the show's ratings, Hansen becomes consumed in making To Catch a Predator a commercial success. An ABC executive attempts to poach Hansen's producer Andie Bender for What Would You Do?, a reality television series inspired by To Catch a Predator. Andie declines, but reconsiders as Hansen's behavior grows increasingly erratic. Dan confides to Hansen his worries that To Catch a Predator will not advance his career. Hansen tells Dan that their work is "cleansing the world of an ancient evil" and recounts his time in Pandalam, India investigating the mysterious disappearance of children where he was told of this "ancient evil" retreating into a cave after the villagers resorted to killing one another out of desperation.

After receiving a letter from a fan in Murphy, Texas, Perverted-Justice founder Xavier Von Erck begins searching for pedophiles in the area. He finds a prospective predator who covers their tracks diligently and, upon discovering they are attending a wake for a Texas state senator in Denton, excitedly surmises that they may be a government official. Under pressure from NBC to improve ratings and eager to catch a high-profile "whale", Hansen cancels an upcoming shoot in New Jersey over Andie's objections and takes the To Catch a Predator team to Texas.

The "whale" is reluctant to meet in person, but gives their phone number, exposing their identity as Bill Conradt, an assistant district attorney for Rockwall County. Andie, reinvigorated, tells ABC she will not join What Would You Do?. Forgoing the usual protocol, Hansen decides to confront Conradt at his house, which heavily armed police officers surround. Hansen receives a call from his wife, who tells him the National Enquirer called her for comment about his affair.

As Hansen and the police prepare to move in, Conradt glares through a window at Hansen, who sees Conradt as the manifestation of the "ancient evil" from his trip to India, before Conradt shoots himself. Andie is disappointed they could not interview Conradt but plans to interview the police officers to salvage the episode. Hansen cries while repeating the chat logs before uttering his catchphrase "What would have happened if I wasn't here?" as he sees the "ancient evil" escape back into the woods. A shaken Dan walks away from the scene; a year later, living in Mesa, Arizona, he receives his SAG membership card in the mail.

== Cast ==
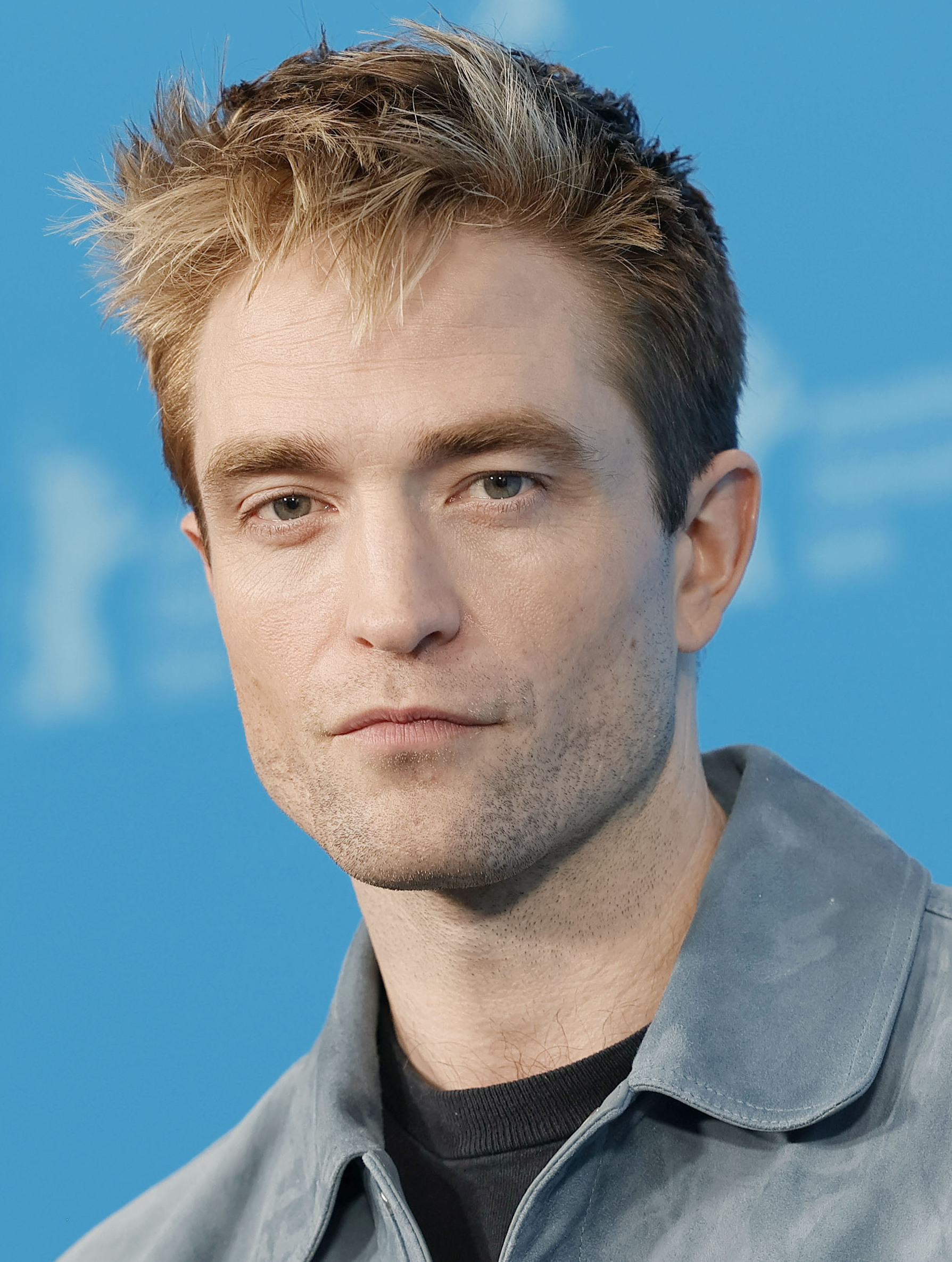
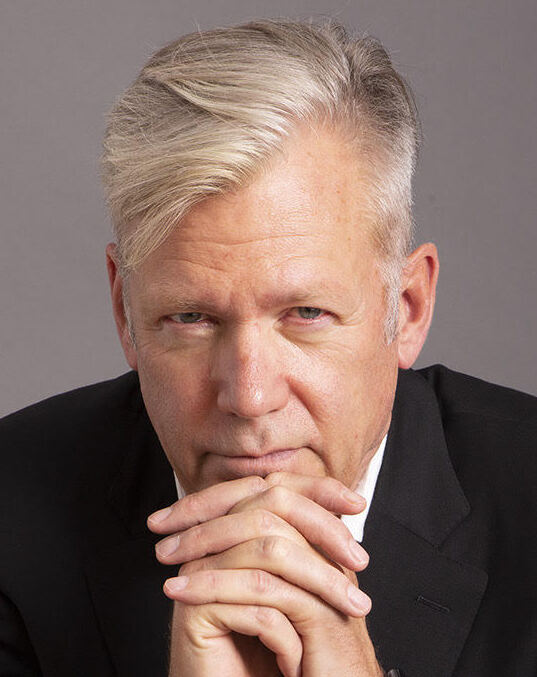
Robert Pattinson (left; pictured in 2025) plays Chris Hansen (right; pictured in 2021)
- Robert Pattinson as Chris Hansen, a television journalist for NBC and host of To Catch a Predator
- Merritt Wever as Andie Bender, Hansen's producer at Dateline NBC, a fictional composite of producers on the show who prioritizes its ratings above all else
- Skyler Gisondo as Daniel "Decoy Dan" Plum, a young aspiring actor hired for the show's sting operations and Hansen's eventual protégé
- Matthew Maher as Xavier Von Erck, an online vigilante and the founder of Perverted-Justice
- Phoebe Bridgers as Del Harvey, a young volunteer for Perverted-Justice and decoy who plays both boys and girls on the show

Bokeem Woodbine plays Cortland Gunn, the chief of police for Murphy, Texas, operating within Rockwall County. Michael Chachere plays a Murphy officer who writes to the show; Chachere, a real life police sergeant for St. Bernard Parish, Louisiana, is credited under his real name. Alex Winter plays Bill Conradt, the assistant district attorney of Rockwall County and Hansen's "whale".

Tony Revolori, Bob Ari, Jonathan Lipnicki, and Matt Smith portray prominent child predators caught on the show in the film; Revolori plays a child predator caught at the beginning of the film, Ari plays a rabbi child predator who gets into a physical confrontation with Hansen, Lipnicki plays a child predator who exposes himself to Plum, and Smith plays a disabled child predator who is interrogated by Plum imitating an incapacitated Hansen. Additionally, filmmakers David Fierro, Caveh Zahedi, Jason Woliner, and Eugene Kotlyarenko all cameo as child predators caught on the show.

Anna Faris plays Mary Joan Hansen, Hansen's wife, and Caroline Hebert plays Krysten, Hansen's younger mistress from Fort Myers, Florida. Eric Rahill plays Troy, Dan's friend who speaks with him throughout the film. Creed Bratton plays Jim Christian, an admirer of Hansen's who suggests killing the predators caught on the show. Former CEO of NBCUniversal Jeff Zucker portrays himself in the film, while Bill Heck plays Stone Phillips, the co-anchor of Dateline NBC. Jessica Hecht plays Patty Patterson, an opportunistic ABC executive looking to poach Andie. Sean Bridgers cameos as Lloyd, one of Zucker's assistants. At the end of the film, Jon Bass plays Richie, Dan's neighbor who gifts him his SAG card.

== Production ==
=== Development ===
Documentarian Lance Oppenheim first became aware of Chris Hansen and his show To Catch a Predator through parodies in other shows such as South Park. In March 2024, Oppenheim's wife, Abbey Rowe, hired Hansen to film a Cameo video to congratulate Oppenheim on his 2024 documentary film Spermworld, which is when Oppenheim began to believe Hansen had developed into a "strange, performative version of himself". Hansen promoted his own content in the video to Oppenheim, prompting Oppenheim to view Hansen's other Cameo videos, saying "[in] one, he called somebody a certified 'flex offender' instead of a certified sex offender. I was like, this is so weird—you can pay him $30, and he’s going to pretend you’re a child predator and then wish you happy birthday. What happened to the Chris Hansen I grew up with? Or was this always the Chris Hansen who existed?" Oppenheim retrospectively called Primetime an "adaptation" of that video.

Two weeks after Oppenheim received the Cameo that Hansen recorded for him, Oppenheim, while meeting with Robert Pattinson and producer Brighton McCloskey for an unrelated project, showed them the Cameo as spurred by what Oppenheim described as an "intrusive thought"; a month later, Pattinson and McCloskey came across a draft of a To Catch a Predator screenplay written by Ajon Singh while looking for scripts to produce for their production company Icki Eneo Arlo. It compelled Pattinson to join the project as producer and approach Oppenheim to direct, calling Oppenheim's directorial style "perfect" for it. Oppenheim considered making a film about Hansen ever since receiving his Cameo, but dropped the idea when he heard David Osit was already producing a documentary about Hansen called Predators. Singh's screenplay, however, changed Oppenheim's mind, with him reflecting that "[Singh] tapped into something that was so up my alley, that felt closer to a fever dream than it did like a conventional biopic ... I [had] to drop everything. This is destiny."

=== Writing ===
Over three years prior to Primetime, the 2007 Esquire article "Tonight on Dateline This Man Will Die" by Luke Dittrich, which details the circumstances behind Conradt's suicide and the botched To Catch a Predator sting operation that attempted to confront him, was optioned by Dittrich to William Iannaccone, a producer at Range Media Partners. In 2023, Ajon Singh, a freshman screenwriter, got into contact with Iannaccone through a mutual friend at the Creative Artists Agency, who introduced Singh to Dittrich's article.

Singh, intrigued by the concept, agreed to write a screenplay based off Dittrich's article, completing the script in two weeks after researching the show and Hansen for months prior. His screenplay was originally titled To Catch a Predator, directly off the show itself. Singh said he was "not really interested in a biopic" and instead "wanted to create something heightened, stylized and subjective, dancing on the line between reality and spectacle". According to Singh, his initial first draft was met with a "'sobering' marketplace" due to its controversial subject matter.

After months of uncertainty regarding the viability of the project, Pattinson got possession of the script and expressed an interest in producing it to Singh, reviving it; Singh, unsure of how the script ever reached Pattinson, named Tyler Falbo, a member of the sketch group Almost Friday, as potentially responsible for passing it along to Pattinson or his producing partner McCloskey at some point. In October 2025, Singh called Primetime the most personally impactful project he had ever worked on.

For the segment in which Hansen recounts investigating a string of child disappearances in India, Singh cited a 1990s article by The New York Times as inspiration. As is depicted in the film, one child each was stolen from villages in Uttar Pradesh; due to nobody being able to solve why it was happening or who was the perpetrator, mob justice took hold. Singh said he "thought that was a really strange story from a reputable news source" and "felt so compelled to do something with it" and chose to combine it with Hansen's real-life investigations of child exploitation in India from the same time period, to give Hansen's "mythical hero" a "mythical villain" to contend with.

Oppenheim said that just as his documentary films Some Kind of Heaven and Ren Faire explore themes of power in The Villages and Renaissance fairs, respectively, Primetime explores power dynamics in the realm of broadcast television:

I think, thematically, a lot of the ideas of power, and how power is obtained, and how power is maintained, and what happens when you have it, and what happens when you don't have it—I think these are kind of constant. They're perennially fascinating subjects, but I think I like looking at that lens and kind of applying it to—whether it's the Renaissance Fair or The Villages or broadcast television with the film I just made—I think there's a lot of overlap with a lot of the subjects.

=== Casting ===
Pattinson resisted taking the role. He faced a daunting schedule of having to prep Primetime and star in Die My Love and The Drama, while also preparing for a role in Christopher Nolan's The Odyssey, and felt he did not have room in his schedule for it. Oppenheim and Singh, however, persistently campaigned to get Pattinson to reconsider and accept the role of Chris Hansen.

Singh reflected how Oppenheim and he "had this fateful dinner at Rob's house ... [Rob] talked about how he would run around the Silver Lake Reservoir listening to Chris Hansen's podcast and he was reciting lines from the script ... so I rewrote the character in five days and we sent the script back to Rob and we were like, 'Here's the version. If you don't like it, we'll go fuck ourselves. But this is the version we think that you could act in.' And he took the weekend and he got back to us and he said, 'Let's do it.'" To further persuade Pattinson, who was, according to Oppenheim, "grappling with a Zyn addiction" at the time, he was sent 200 cases of Zyn along with Singh's rewritten draft as addressed to "Chris Han-Zyn" by Oppenheim. Singh credited Pattinson for the emphasis on a "mystical angels and demons sort of element".

Pattinson said he first became familiar with To Catch a Predator while staying in the United States as he starred in the Twilight films. He called imitating Hansen's voice "incredibly difficult" and studied his appearances on podcasts, recounting how he would "wander around the streets saying what he's talking about" and confuse bystanders due to the dark nature of Hansen's work. Pattinson watched every episode of To Catch a Predator "in chronological order" noting "[y]ou can see the change in his persona and performance, the slickness of it." He further described his version of Hansen as "a pretty sympathetic character to me ... [i]t wasn’t supposed to be any kind of takedown, but you can’t choose how the audience feels". Oppenheim has called Pattinson's Hansen in Primetime "a cross between Jerry Maguire and Dracula".

(L to R) Merritt Wever (pictured in 2026), Skyler Gisondo (2026), and Alex Winter (2026)

Merritt Wever spoke to television producers from the time to help prepare for her role, specifically what it was like to work with hosts similar to Hansen. Wever wished to play the role as a manifestation of the "cycles of harm", describing how Andie is "very much like a dog that is kicked at certain times by Chris, and she turns around and kicks the nearest dog around her" which she compared to the phenomenon of abused children who grow up to be child abusers. Andie is shown excessively using Nicorette gum that evokes an "animal- or monster-esque" quality, with Wever saying she "went through a hundred packs of whatever was sugar-free" during filming. Oppenheim had originally considered casting Amanda Knox in the role of Andie, an idea which Primetime's casting director Francine Maisler rejected; reacting to the revelation, Knox said she would have done it had she been offered the part.

Skyler Gisondo's role is based on Dan Schrack, the decoy for the botched sting operation involving Conradt. Gisondo compared being starstruck by acting alongside Pattinson to Dan's admiration of Hansen, saying his "personal nervousness bled into it". To portray Dan as a "musical theater kid" Gisondo worked with a vocal coach to have "the natural register of [his] voice ... be a little bit higher so it didn’t seem as comical of a reach when [he] went to the decoy voice". For a scene where Dan adopts Hansen's mannerisms to take his place on the show, Gisondo sought to mimic Pattinson's impersonation of Hansen's voice rather than Hansen's voice directly. To prepare, Gisondo had Pattinson read Dan's lines on set as a model.

Oppenheim reached out to Alex Winter directly for the role of Bill Conradt, knowing him through their shared work as documentarians. Winter, a victim of child sexual abuse himself, spoke with district attorneys and Conradt's former colleagues within the Rockwall area to prepare for the role, saying that he "just wanted Bill to be a human being because Bill Conradt, whatever you think of him, was absolutely a human being." Winter elaborated that, while not seeking to "exonerate" Conradt through his performance, he "did sympathize [with Conradt]. It seemed like a very tragic case that involved coercion and a kind of grotesque throwing to the lions for the sake of ratings, a desperation for greater ratings, and very little nuance and examination of human beings involved ... [Oppenheim] knew my own history with abuse, and he knows I do a lot of stuff outside of my work with group therapy and helping kids in the abuse space. So he knew that I [have] a pretty deep understanding of the predator-survivor relationship and what that is."

Phoebe Bridgers knew Oppenheim before production of Primetime; he sought her out because he believed someone "who had such a deep speaking voice [that] could produce this beautiful, angelic singing voice" was perfect for the role of a decoy. Jeff Zucker, who plays a "boorish version of himself" in Primetime, oversaw programming for NBCUniversal at the time To Catch a Predator aired and is "the driver of tasking Chris Hansen and his team to think of the show as a commercial object". Oppenheim was interested in casting Zucker, saying he "loved the idea, keeping with the project of making this a true fever dream, of having real people alongside actors" and was pleasantly surprised when Zucker agreed to take the part. Zucker said he wanted to appear in a film with Pattinson and added that it helped him remember "how fun those days were". Creed Bratton was cast by Oppenheim due to his "menacing" performance on The Office, saying he was surprised Bratton had never played a "seriously intense" role before. Jonathan Lipnicki was cast based off his debut performance in Jerry Maguire; for Lipnicki's role, Pattinson and he improvised for nearly ten minutes, which Oppenheim found to be "incredible".

=== Pre-production ===
In October 2024, it was officially announced that Oppenheim would make his narrative feature film debut using Singh's script, with A24 financing and distributing and Pattinson and Ari Aster producing; Pattinson was rumored to star, but was unconfirmed. The project's plot was given as "a journalist who takes on an underworld of crime and changes television forever", with speculation that it was based on Hansen and To Catch a Predator. In December 2024, Singh met with Pattinson and Oppenheim over Zoom to further refine the screenplay ahead of filming the next month.

=== Filming ===
Principal photography began in New Orleans under the production title Bluefin Tuna on February 10, 2025, and concluded by March 28. Oppenheim wanted to shoot Primetime on-location in his native Florida, but due to Louisiana's tax incentives it was chosen instead. Filming also took place in New York and Sri Lanka. The production spent $14.5 million in Louisiana.

Production designer Alex DiGerlando, cinematographer David Bolen, and Oppenheim took inspiration from Larry Sultan's 2004 The Valley series cataloguing adult-film productions within San Fernando Valley homes for Primetime's set design; they modeled the sting houses on Sultan's work due to adult-films and To Catch a Predator both "mov[ing] into a location ... [while performing] slight modifications" to accommodate hidden film equipment. Watching To Catch a Predator in preparation for Primetime, DiGerlando noted the absence of family photographs in contrast to the abundance of ornaments, artwork, and lamps, which he worked to emulate. The motels where Hansen and crew stay between stings were modeled on Alec Soth's 2006 Niagara series of photographs taken of contemporary motel rooms situated around Niagara Falls.

For a scene featuring Hansen's home, DiGerlando searched for houses within the New Orleans area that resembled a close approximation of contemporary photos taken of Hansen's real 2006 residence in Stamford, Connecticut. DiGerlando called it "a tricky thing to find in New Orleans because it’s not really the same type of architecture", adding "[Hansen] is a guy who feels like he’s doing very important work and should be recognized for it more than he actually is ... I think we were trying to give him a house that he imagined he was deserving of."

Oliver Stone's JFK served as a point of inspiration for Oppenheim and the editor, Daniel Garber, specifically "[the] kinds of rhythms they were able to find—even within really disparate pieces of footage—and [how they were able to draw] something more fictional out of real-world events." Stone's Natural Born Killers, Billy Wilder's Ace in the Hole, and William Friedkin's The Exorcist were also films Oppenheim drew inspiration from when directing Primetime and to which he screened for members of the crew ahead of filming for their shared portrayal of a "descent into madness"; additionally, the use of color and texture in the films of Michael Mann were emulated when crafting Primetime's visuals. A scene in Mann's Manhunter where its characters examine a message under an "'unrealistic but beautiful' blue source" was mimicked in Primetime when Hansen and the To Catch a Predator crew view Conradt's messages on a computer and are illuminated by a blue hue.

According to Garber, Primetime originally ended during the immediate aftermath of the raid on Conradt's home, with Pattinson's Hansen "stuck in this loop doing these incantations, repeating the chat logs". Gisondo suggested they add a follow-up with Dan one year later to Oppenheim, showing Dan getting his SAG card, to add "a sense of closure" for his character. Oppenheim agreed and convinced Singh to write an additional scene to bookend the film.

Hansen was not involved with the production, with Oppenheim saying "I felt like I had everything I needed with the Cameo." Nathan Fielder, described as a "great creative mentor" of Oppenheim's by Singh, and David Osit watched cuts and gave advice during production, which earned them a "special thanks" credit.

=== Cinematography ===
[To Catch a Predator] doesn’t exist on DVDs, Blu-ray, all that we really have of it are these 360p and 480p versions that have seemingly been digitized by somebody else. So we’re watching something that’s been essentially reprinted twice. The audience is interacting with an object that had been scanned, that had been corrupted in some way. I liked conceptually that it rhymed with what we were doing with this sort of operatic, heightened portrait of Chris Hansen, the internet’s version of Chris Hansen.

— Oppenheim explaining the purpose for printing Primetime onto 16 mm film before having it digitized

Primetime was printed onto 16 mm film which was then digitized, (Note: An exception was any footage shot using DV footage or with the Plumbicon, which were excluded "to retain the digital look it already had, without processing".) creating a "layer of removal the scan supplied between the audience and the original image" as an attempt to capture the way To Catch a Predator is commonly viewed in the modern day. Oppenheim wanted to avoid the "grayscale" of modern cinema and have Primetime harken back to the "saturated, almost pastel-like" look of 2000s television as overseen by colorist Damien Vandercruyssen, citing The O.C. and Smallville as templates. It was shot in a 4:3 aspect ratio which "helped add a period patina to it," according to Bolen, adding: "We can kill ourselves to make all the period details right, but then sometimes, when you shoot in high-def, it looks fake because you're not used to seeing those objects or those clothes through that type of lens".

Seeking to authentically capture the sting operations for Primetime, Oppenheim consulted with Mitchell Wagenberg, a veteran camera operator within the television industry who worked on the original To Catch a Predator series, who recommended use of a Sony DXC-M2 Plumbicon, a "novelty" video camera tube from 1982 that had long since been discontinued. The crew experimented with 20 Plumbicons before settling on one Plumbicon they found that had deteriorated in quality, but to an extent Oppenheim approved of due to its "dreamlike" quality originating from its "tubes [having] been burnt to a crisp, so every time we turned the camera on it would distort the images. It almost looked like a nuclear explosion had been set off right in front of us, and I loved that about it". The Plumbicon was used "mostly for accent moments or flashes within sequences rather than entire scenes" and most prominently featured in three sequences: the opening shot where Hansen recites the chat logs to himself, when we first see Conradt alone in his home after having his identity exposed, and the exchanging portrait shots between Hansen and Conradt during the climax.

Primetime's cinematographer David Bolen used a tiny colonoscopy camera traveling through a "mini-LED tunnel on a rotating gimbal that had spinning lights" to visualize the "cosmic connection" between Pattinson's Hansen and Winter's Bill Conradt following the exposure of Conradt's identity as Hansen's "whale".

Garber was brought on as editor in the early stages of development for Primetime, prior to the commencement of principal photography. Garber described the process of editing Primetime as "very complicated" due to the varied stylistic choices that combine several methods of filming, including "degraded, grungy-looking" DV footage, surveillance video meant to replicate the show itself, traditional digital cinematography which added a "fantastical and hallucinatory" aura, among others. Oppenheim prescribed different "psychological formats" to the various camera types used when shooting Primetime, positing that when the film was shot in DV footage it was "objective" or when it was shot with the Plumbicon or a digital camera it respectively became a "full expression of [Chris Hansen's] id" or "superego" as well as the "inner psychology and subjectivity" of the predators. Altogether, Bolen used 12 different camera formats during filming.

For the moment when Hansen and his crew discover the identity of their "whale", the filmmakers used a tiny camera made for colonoscopies and shot it traveling through a "mini-LED tunnel on a rotating gimbal that had spinning lights" which landed on Pattinson's face at the end to visualize the effect of "the camera [moving] through [a] computer" and to translate the "cosmic connection" between Hansen and Conradt. Bolen was worried if A24 would approve the use of his footage due to the colonoscopy camera's native resolution being in 480p, but they were ultimately given full permission to incorporate it, which Bolen was thankful for, calling it his favorite part of the movie.

== Music ==
Ari Balouzian composed the score, while Bridgers contributed the single "On Video", which plays over the end credits for Primetime. Having composed for Oppenheim's previous projects, such as Some Kind of Heaven and Ren Faire, Balouzian created 24 compositions, with his track "Savior" showcasing alongside "On Video" as an end credits feature. Pattinson listened to the soundtrack while filming to help get into character. Speaking to The Line of Best Fit in September 2026, Balouzian stated that he "started working on Primetime after reading the script, and had access to the dailies while they were shooting, so the process started super early".

As described by NME, Bridgers's "On Video" works to "draw on elements of the original score for the film" featuring "a softer opening [building] into heavier, distorted guitar textures before settling back down." She performed the single as part of The Lost Tour, which coincided with the release of Primetime. She also performed "On Video" for A24's Sound Check at Cherry Lane Theatre series as a live performance directed by Oppenheim, featuring Ethan Gruska on piano and Bridgers in front of a backdrop of TV sets, which had been filmed in September and released on October 9.

The soundtrack released alongside the film on September 25, 2026, published by A24 Music. The track "Savior" dropped prior to the soundtrack on September 11.

== Release ==
Lance Oppenheim and Robert Pattinson at the 83rd Venice International Film Festival

Primetime's connection to Hansen and To Catch a Predator was revealed in May 2026, when A24 released the teaser trailer and first poster with Pattinson playing Hansen. The logline said the film was set in 2006, which some publications recognized as the year Bill Conradt committed suicide, which contributed to the show's cancellation.

Primetime premiered in the main competition of the 83rd Venice International Film Festival on September 5, 2026. It was theatrically released in the US on September 25. In April 2026, Indian streaming service Lionsgate Play announced that Primetime would be part of its initial batch of theatrical-first releases in September 2026. It was released in France and Germany on September 23 and 24, respectively, in Australia and New Zealand on October 29, and in the United Kingdom on October 30. In October 2026, Sony Pictures Worldwide Acquisitions acquired distribution rights in the Middle East, Israel, South Africa, Switzerland, Indonesia, Thailand, Singapore, South Korea, and Vietnam. Primetime was banned in Malaysia by the country's Film Censorship Board, previously having had its release delayed before being cancelled outright. On November 3, Primetime was made available for digital streaming. A 4K and standard Blu-ray was announced that day, to be released on January 26, 2027.

== Reception ==
=== Box office ===
As of November 19, 2026, Primetime grossed $47.1 million in the United States and Canada, and $17.2 million in other territories, for a worldwide total of $64.3 million.

In the United States and Canada, Primetime was released alongside Heart of the Beast, Forgotten Island, and Avengers Endgame: Encore, and was projected to gross $17–20 million in its opening weekend. It debuted to $19.2 million from 2,863 theaters, becoming the third-best opening weekend for A24, behind Backrooms ($81.4 million) and Civil War ($25.5 million). In its sophomore weekend it made $7.7 million (a drop of 59%) and then $4 million in its third weekend. By October 25, a month from its initial release, Primetime was removed from 2,573 theaters after having grossed over $45.3 million.

In the United Kingdom and Ireland, Primetime was projected to gross £800,000 to £1.2 million in its opening weekend and £2–4 million total. It opened in second and grossed £1.75 million ($2.33 million), placing closely behind Wicker, also in its opening weekend, by £10,141.

=== Critical response ===
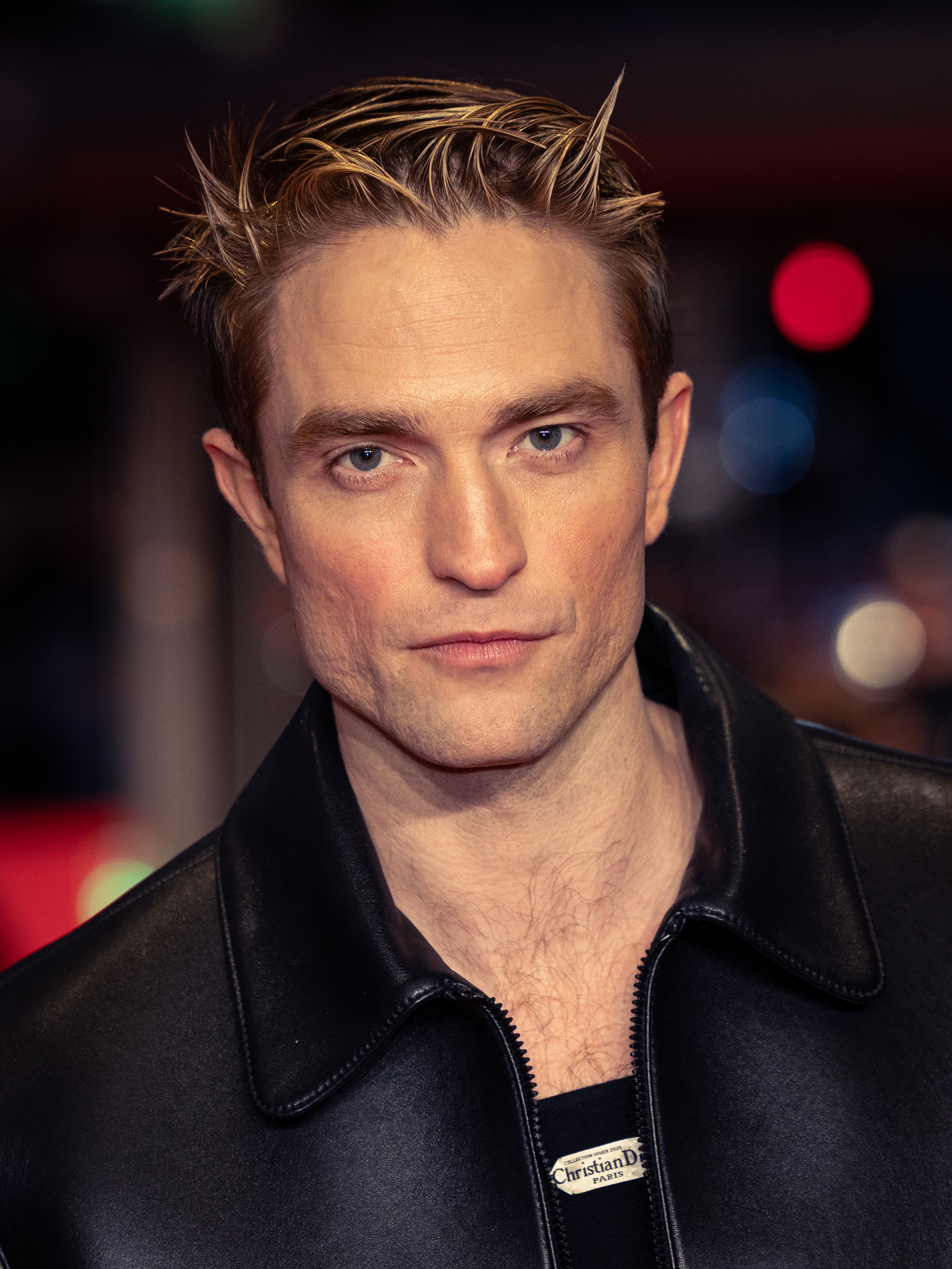
Robert Pattinson received widespread acclaim from critics for his performance.

On the review aggregator website Rotten Tomatoes, 86% of 281 critics' reviews are positive, with an average rating of 7.3/10. The website's consensus reads: "Turning the camera's scrutinizing eye back onto To Catch a Predator's journalistic legacy, Primetime interrogates the slippery boundary between justice and lurid spectacle with crackling style and an outstanding Robert Pattinson." Metacritic, which uses a weighted average, assigned Primetime a score of 68 out of 100, based on 54 critics, indicating "generally favorable" reviews. Audiences polled by CinemaScore gave it an average grade of "B" on an A+ to F scale, while 56% of those surveyed by PostTrak said they would definitely recommend it.

Manohla Dargis for The New York Times praised Skyler Gisondo and Alex Winter, writing that they added "emotion" and "push the movie into depths it doesn’t remain in" but otherwise felt that Primetime "looks good and moves well, and the dark, saturated colors and visual grittiness add some fine Expressionistic texture. Yet it’s hard to know to what end, or to care." Nicholas Barber of the BBC gave Primetime five out of five, calling Pattinson's performance "extraordinary" and "the best performance yet from the most intriguing actor of his generation". He described Pattinson as "completely immersed in the character's strangeness" and his approach to the role as "exaggerated and theatrical without ever being arch." While finding "nothing radical" about the message, Barber praised Oppenheim's direction for "[dropping] us into the middle of a fever dream in which everything is wholly believable yet unsettlingly weird", calling the film "not a straightforward drama, but a heightened, hallucinatory black comedy."

David Rooney of The Hollywood Reporter called Primetime "a morbidly fascinating inquiry into performative justice, moral superiority and public shaming as crude fuel for reality television". He called Pattinson "riveting" and praised the supporting performances of Phoebe Bridgers, Gisondo, and Merritt Wever, but found the screenplay "a tad heavy-handed in making Hansen a borderline-unhinged egomaniac from the start". Hadley Freeman for The Times called Primetime "an all-time career-best performance" for Pattinson.

Jessica Kiang of Variety praised the "dazzling" cast for delivering "revelatory" and "career-best" work, writing, "there are really no weak links in the chain of performances here". She called Pattinson's impression of Hansen's voice and physical mannerisms "uncanny" and also praised Wever ("absolutely blistering"), Gisondo ("moving"), and Bridgers, whose performance she considered "the second of the film's most impressive transformations". Kiang also commended the craft, including the cinematography, which she described as "greasy, saturated images, so livid with grain that it feels like they leave dirt under your fingernails", as well as the "throbbing, queasy score" and the "inspired, [...] often very witty editing".

Ryan Lattanzio of IndieWire gave Primetime a B; he considered the "exuberance" of Oppenheim's direction its "primary allure", noting its "tweaked-out style and sleazy/douchey vibe of early-2000s videotape and closed-circuit four-quadrant TV." Lattanzio wrote that it begins with "Hansen's sordid personality already baked in", feeling Pattinson played the character as "someone visibly diseased in the head from the very top". Nick Schager for The Daily Beast wrote that "Primetime has nowhere to go but pure luridness" and criticized Pattinson's performance, saying "[there] isn’t a single moment when Pattinson’s Hansen resembles a real-life human being; though his accent is spot-on, his mannered speech, deliberate movements, unhinged glares, and affected smiles turn him into a cross between Henry: Portrait of a Serial Killer and Heath Ledger’s Joker."

Some critics unfavorably compared Primetime to David Osit's 2025 documentary Predators, which also chronicles the production of To Catch a Predator. Rooney wrote, "While Osit’s doc contemplated what the collective thirst for justice and appetite for televised humiliation might say about the American public, Primetime never digs that deep, which made me question what this flashy but shallow movie hopes to achieve." Matt Brennan of the Los Angeles Times found it "remarkably incurious about To Catch a Predator and its consequences", writing that Oppenheim's "lurid" style used "some of the very same gutter sleaze tactics as the original series". He criticized the focus on Hansen himself as thematically limiting, writing: "Primetime isn't a Chris Hansen hit piece. In fact, it's so in love with its flawed protagonist that it can't see he's the least compelling character in the movie, an ambitious, arrogant, grasping, unscrupulous man we've met countless times before." Both Brennan and Lattanzio felt Primetime offered "little insight" into Hansen and To Catch a Predator that was not already covered in Predators. Osit was asked to view a cut of Primetime prior to its release, calling it "probably one of the most interesting professional experiences of my life, sitting and watching that film" and saying it was "fascinating to watch."

=== Hansen's response ===
Hansen (pictured in 2025), who was not consulted during the production, criticized it as "detached from reality".

The Primetime crew did not consult Hansen during production. Hansen said he learned about Primetime in late 2025, and that he was informed that Oppenheim intended it as a "love letter to [him]"; Oppenheim disputed this in an interview with the Columbia Journalism Review. When asked about it in May 2026, Hansen said, "they reached out to me this week, and I've been asked not to talk about it a great deal at this point." Of the trailer, Hansen said: "It looks very dramatic. I know [Pattinson] is a popular actor, and I know the director is a popular guy. I also have some questions: What's Hollywood's motive here?" He added that Pattinson's performance looked "almost vampirish", and that Pattinson's imitation of his voice was "pretty good", if overly dramatic.

On Jesse Watters Primetime, Hansen said a lawyer from A24 asked him before a private screening to sign a contract that would "take away his name, image, and brand, essentially, as well as any potential legal rights that would come out of the movie". Hansen refused to sign it after speaking with his lawyers. Variety reported that the agreement was a standard non-disclosure agreement (NDA) signed by preview audiences to prevent spoilers and protect A24's intellectual property. Hansen attested that Osit did not have to sign an NDA before he saw Primetime, and that the NDA included an agreement not to take legal action against A24.

Hansen purchased pre-show advertising for every theatrical screening of Primetime. The ads show Hansen in a kitchen like the ones seen in his sting operations, asking the audience to "take a seat" before directing the audience to his streaming service TruBlu. Hansen wanted to end the advertisement with the disclaimer that Primetime is "a Hollywood fantasy version" of true events, but was advised against it to avoid potential legal action by A24. Hansen told the Columbia Journalism Review that he rejected involvement in a pitched promotional campaign: "[A24 seemed] eager to whore me out in a promotional campaign ... [all] this bullshit about Robert this and Robert that and 'We'll do a podcast, you can fly to London.' I don't care, honestly. I'm really fucking busy being the real Chris Hansen. It’s a seven-day-a-week job." In response to Hansen's criticisms, Oppenheim said he was "excited for him to have a seat and watch the movie in a movie theater, if that's where he chooses to watch it ... I'm excited to hear what he has to say about it."

Hansen was critical of Primetime after seeing it: "Obviously I'm not objective because the character is, you know, me, but it was so detached from reality or anything I've experienced then or now doing the investigations. I'm not sure what the point of it was." He felt Primetime portrayed him in a "twisted, dark, [and] dishonest" manner and said the filmmakers were "just as big of predators as the people who get caught in these investigations". Oppenheim responded that Hansen was a "complicated hero", that he "wanted to show what the effects were on someone who does this work", and that Primetime "[isn't meant] to be representational of reality in any way."

A month following the release, Interview quoted Hansen calling the Esquire piece Primetime was based on "a hit job", saying the most offensive aspect was "the notion that [he] was an aloof father", and criticizing Oppenheim personally: "[D]ozens and dozens of [Epstein] cases ... were settled quietly and quickly that never made the news with NDAs where people can't come forward because they would be in trouble ... if you're talking about [the entertainment] industry that was ruled by one of the most prolific predators to ever walk the planet and Harvey Weinstein, maybe this isn't surprising. Maybe we should look at Lance Oppenheim's chat." Hansen has said he invited Oppenheim and Pattinson to appear on his podcast, Have a Seat with Chris Hansen, which Oppenheim has expressed interest in doing, although saying he "ideally" wanted to do it on The A24 Podcast.

=== Accolades ===
Award	Date of ceremony	Category	Nominee(s)	Result	Ref.
Hollywood Music in Media Awards	November 18, 2026	Best Original Score – Independent Film	Ari Balouzian	Nominated	
Hollywood Music in Media Awards	November 18, 2026	Best Original Song – Independent Film	"On Video" – Phoebe Bridgers, Jack Antonoff, and Christian Lee Hutson	Nominated	
Gotham Independent Film Awards	November 30, 2026	Best Feature	Lance Oppenheim, Ari Aster, Fred Berger, William Iannaccone, Brian Kavanaugh-Jones, Lars Knudsen, Brighton McCloskey, Robert Pattinson	Pending	
Gotham Independent Film Awards	November 30, 2026	Best Adapted Screenplay	Ajon Singh	Pending	
Gotham Independent Film Awards	November 30, 2026	Outstanding Supporting Performance	Skyler Gisondo	Pending	
