= Sweetie (internet avatar) =

Computer animated child used as an avatar to lure sexual predators

Sweetie was a computer animated child that was created by children's rights organization Terre des hommes as a sting operation. It was used to lure online sexual predators into providing personally-identifiable information, so that this information could then be reported to law enforcement agencies.

== Background ==
In 2013, the Dutch branch of Terre des hommes, noting that efforts to combat child sex tourism in impoverished countries had resulted in pedophiles instead seeking victims online, joined forces with local advertising agency Lemz that at first preferred to remain anonymous to create the animated, photorealistic image of a 10-year-old Filipina girl.

== How Sweetie worked ==
A 'puppeteer' for Sweetie would enter a chat room, claiming to be a ten-year-old Philippine girl. Sexual predators would open webcam connections with 'her', during which programmers would animate Sweetie as necessary in real time through motion capture. As the dialogue between Sweetie and the predator progressed, the predator would make a $20 wire transfer and provide his Skype address. Once this information was gathered, the chat with Sweetie would be shut down, and the information was given to the local police or Interpol.

After receiving a letter from the United Nations, the team of the advertising agency Lemz admitted that they were behind this initiative. Strategy director of Lemz Mark Woerde gave one public interview to the Dutch TV show RTL Late Night to explain the intervention and to make clear, for security reasons, that they were no longer involved in Terre des hommes, Sweetie or police activities.

== Outcome ==
During the ten weeks of operation, Sweetie was contacted by more than 20,000 users from 71 countries. Terre des hommes identified 1,000 suspected predators, and passed their names, IP addresses, and social media accounts on to Interpol.

The first arrest resulting from Sweetie-gleaned information occurred in Brisbane, Australia, in February 2014; however, Troels Ørting Jørgensen of the European Cybercrime Centre has expressed concerns that judges may consider Sweetie to have been entrapment, and thereby rule inadmissible any data ultimately sourced to Sweetie. Sweetie led to the arrest of 46 people in Australia. In 2014, an Australian man became the first person to be convicted as a result of the sting operation. Scott Robert Hansen, a registered sex offender, pleaded guilty to sending obscene pictures of himself to Sweetie, possessing images of child sexual abuse on his computer, and failing to comply with a sex offenders order. He was sentenced to two years in prison.

Sweetie has since been retired and "will not be used again".

== See also ==
- Child Exploitation and Online Protection Centre
- Internet Safety Act
- Creep Catchers
- Negobot
