= Terre des hommes =

Children's rights charity

Coordinates: 46°34′23″N 6°37′47″E

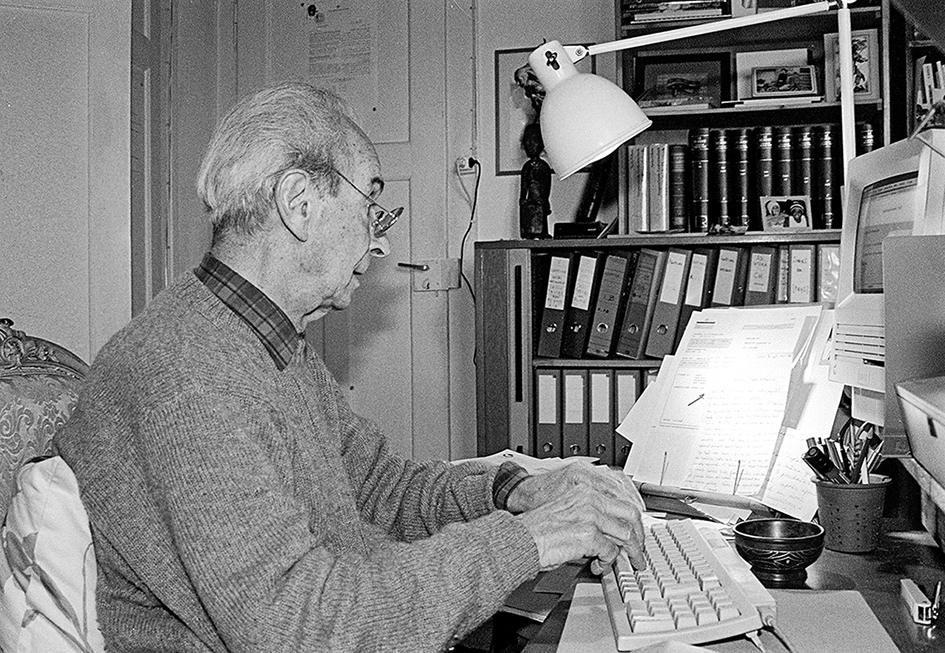
Edmond Kaiser, founder of Terre des hommes, here in his office at Sentinelles in 1995 (Photograph by Markus Schweizer)

Terre des hommes (pronounced [tɛʁ dez‿ɔm]; French for 'Land of People' / 'Land of Men'), also capitalized as Terre des Hommes, is an international children's rights charitable humanitarian umbrella organization under the aegis of the International Federation of Terre des Hommes (TDHIF), with independent organizations in Canada, Denmark, France, Germany, Italy, Luxembourg, the Netherlands, Switzerland, Spain, and Syria. It was founded in 1960 by Edmond Kaiser in Lausanne, Switzerland. The organization is named after Antoine de Saint-Exupéry's 1939 philosophical memoir Terre des hommes (English title: Wind, Sand and Stars). An important part of the TDHIF's work is as a consultant to the United Nations Economic and Social Council (ECOSOC). Promoting the Convention on the Rights of a Child is an important activity of Tdh. Advocating for children's rights, defending them, and spreading information are tasks which Terre des Hommes – to the aid of children considers a priority. TDHIF runs the two campaigns "Destination Unknown" – Children on the Move (www.destination-unknown.org) and "Children Win" – Changing the Game of Mega Sporting Events (www.childrenwin.org). Foundation of the organization was awarded Balzan Prize in 2018.

== Switzerland ==
Two organizations are based in Switzerland. Besides Terre des Hommes Switzerland, there is the Lausanne based Tdh Foundation – child relief (Tdh). Founded in 1960, the Terre des hommes Foundation (Tdh) is Switzerland's leading children's rights organisation, committed to protecting the lives and rights of children and improving their well-being. To achieve this, the organisation sets up innovative programmes focusing on areas such as health, migration and access to justice, designed specifically to have an impact in the short and long term.

For over 60 years, the Terre des hommes Foundation has been working in difficult contexts, whether in countries at war, regions affected by natural disasters, or areas where poverty and malnutrition force millions of children and their families to migrate. Currently active in more than 30 countries, it works with its own teams and with local and international partners to design and implement projects on the ground. The organisation encourages the active participation of children and young people to promote their emancipation. It also advocates respect for their rights and supports them in expressing their needs and interests.

== Germany ==
The Germany branch currently supports 368 projects in 43 countries (2022), and has regional offices in Colombia, India, Iraq, Thailand, South Africa and Germany.

== Netherlands ==
The Netherlands branch supported 297 projects, created and established by local organisations, in 22 countries.

=== Webcam child sex tourism awareness raising ===
In 2013, adult offenders from rich countries, willing to pay for watching children from poor countries to perform sexual acts in front of the webcam, i.e. engaging in webcam child sex tourism, were recorded and their identity disclosed. They used a motion captured virtual bait: a Filipino girl named Sweetie. Identities of more than 1,000 offenders from more than 65 countries were handed over to Interpol. Arrests were made and other victims were rescued, resulting in global media coverage for the project. Together with Avaaz.org, Terre des Hommes the Netherlands has created an online petition to pressure governments to adopt proactive investigation policies in order to protect children against webcam child sex tourism.

== Spain ==
The Spain branch financially supports various direct relief programs for children in many countries in Africa, Latin America and Eastern Europe, for social aid and education, the rights of children and mother-and-child health care. In Spain there is also a campaign for awareness-raising, entitled "Stop child trafficking", with the aim of fighting all the various forms of child exploitation. Terre des hommes Spain also carries out significant medical aid for children from several African countries, thanks to the program "Journey towards Life".

== France ==
The France branch works with partners in the field on activities that protect and defend economic, social and cultural rights.

== Luxembourg ==
"Let us make a commitment for the rights of the children". Terre des Hommes Luxembourg (TdHL) was constituted as a non-profit organisation on July 10, 1966. In April, 2010, TdHL got the accreditation of the Ministry of Foreign Affairs (Luxembourg) and the name humanitarian NGO (Non-Governmental Organization). Fields of activity: Cooperation in the development and the improvement of the fate of childhood, regardless of race, religion, politics and culture and to bring an immediate and direct help to the most unfortunate childhood. It also has for object to make sensitive the public opinion in the problems of developing countries and to collaborate with agencies or individuals who pursue similar purposes as well as with the public authorities.

== 2008 Ethiopian paedophilia allegations ==
In 2008 Terre Des Hommes-Lausanne brought a defamation suit against a teacher in Ethiopia, Jill Campbell, for accusing the branch of knowingly hiding child abuse in one of its centres in the village of Jari. Mrs Campbell compiled evidence which helped to convict a British paedophile who was sentenced in 2003 to nine years hard labour in prison. Another suspect committed suicide after posting a confession on the internet. However Mrs Campbell alleged that senior staff running the centre knew of the abuse, covered it up and failed to inform the authorities.

Mrs Campbell faced 6 months in prison if she failed to withdraw the allegations. Her husband Gary had already withdrawn similar allegations in order to avoid prison and ensure that one of the couple would be able to look after their two ten-year-old adopted children. The charity eventually withdraw its suit before Campbell was due to be sentenced on 7 March, saying that her husband's apology was sufficient.
