= Chris Hansen =

American television journalist (born 1959)

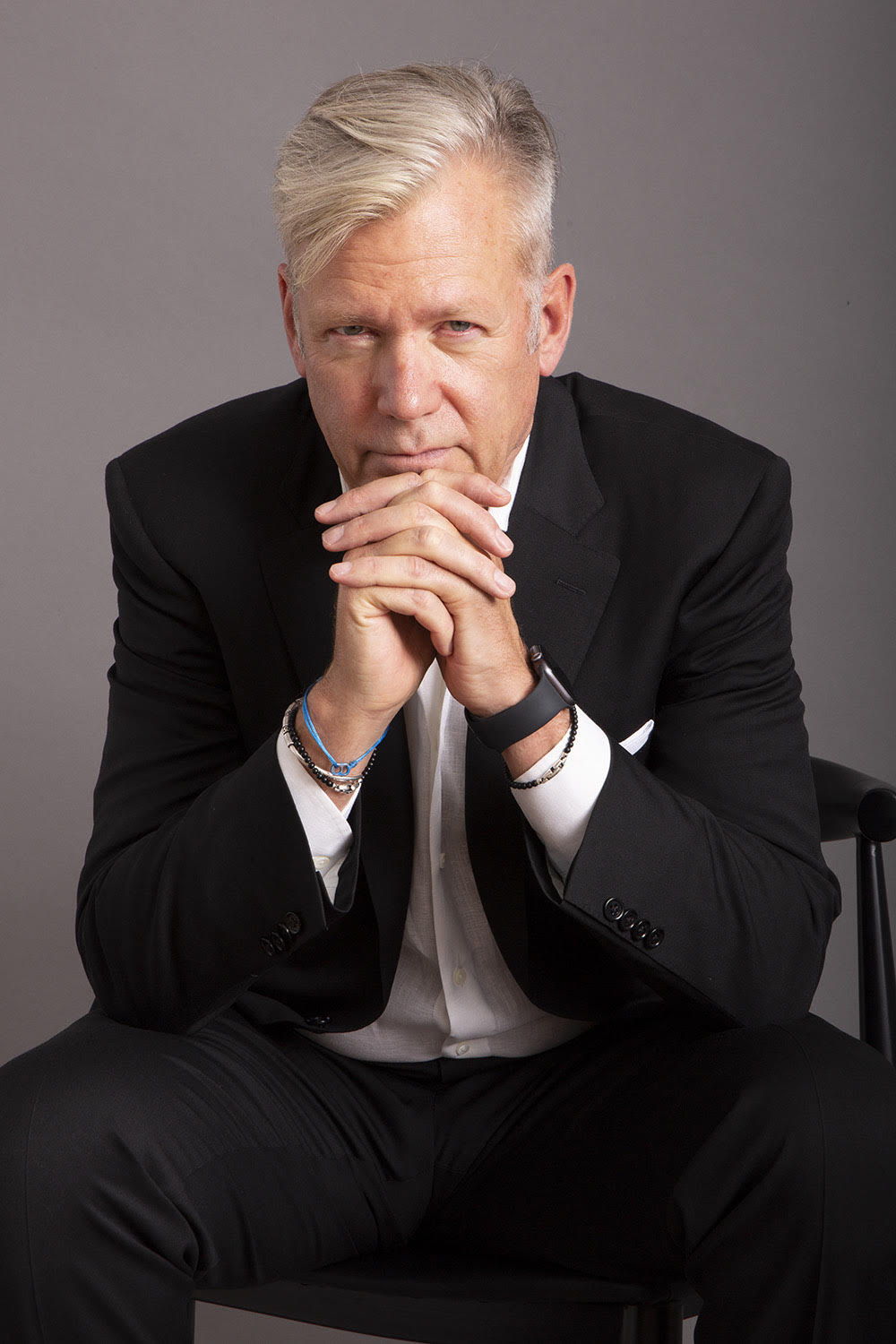
- Hansen in 2021
- Born: Christopher Edward Hansen; September 13, 1959 (age 67); Chicago, Illinois, U.S.
- Education: Michigan State University (BA)
- Occupations: Television presenter; journalist; anchor; YouTuber
- Years active: 1981–present
- Known for: Dateline NBC; To Catch a Predator
- Spouse(s): Mary Joan (m. 1989; div. 2020) Gabrielle Gagnon (m. 2021)
- Children: 2

YouTube information
- Channel: Chris Hansen
- Years active: 2019–present
- Genres: Entertainment; True crime; Interview
- Subscribers: 683 thousand
- Views: 46.2 million
- Last updated: 24 September 2026
- Hansen's voice Hansen introducing an interview with Shawn Rech (2019)

Christopher Edward Hansen (born September 13, 1959) is an American television presenter, journalist, and YouTube personality. During his tenure as a correspondent for Dateline NBC, he hosted the program's segment To Catch a Predator (2004–2007), in which online predators would be apprehended by law enforcement using sting operations.

After parting ways with NBC in 2013, he began hosting Killer Instinct on Investigation Discovery in 2015, a short-lived series that documented homicide investigations. That same year, he replaced Matt Doran as the host of the syndicated series Crime Watch Daily, which he hosted for two seasons. He also hosted his own segment similar to his Dateline feature, Hansen vs. Predator. He co-founded the true crime–oriented streaming service TruBlu in 2020, for which he produced and starred in the web series Takedown with Chris Hansen.

Hansen has earned several accolades, including ten Emmy Awards, five Edward R. Murrow Awards, three Clarion awards, the National Press Club award, and awards for excellence from the Associated Press and United Press International. Hansen and numerous subjects of his investigations have garnered online cult followings, and Hansen is considered a progenitor in content centered around sting operations.

In 2025, a documentary on his career, titled Predators, was distributed by MTV Entertainment Studios. In 2026, A24 released the film Primetime, starring Robert Pattinson as Hansen. Primetime is based on Hansen's work on To Catch a Predator, and a 2007 Esquire story on the show, "Tonight on Dateline This Man Will Die".

== Early life and education ==
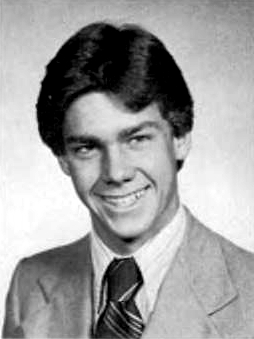
Hansen's 1977 high school yearbook photo

Christopher Edward Hansen was born in Chicago, Illinois, on September 13, 1959, and grew up in West Bloomfield Township and Birmingham, Michigan. In an interview with City Pulse, Hansen said that he first wanted to be a journalist when he was 14 years old, watching and following the police and FBI investigation of the disappearance of Jimmy Hoffa.

Hansen attended Brother Rice High School in Bloomfield Hills, Michigan. Hansen graduated from Michigan State University with a Bachelor of Arts in telecommunication in 1981.

== Career ==
=== 1981–2013: Career with NBC ===
In 1981, Hansen became a reporter for NBC affiliate WILX in Lansing, Michigan during his senior year at Michigan State University. He later reported for WFLA in Tampa, Florida, various newspapers and radio stations in Michigan and WXYZ in Detroit. In 1988, he was hired as an investigative reporter and anchor at WDIV in Detroit. In May 1993, Hansen joined NBC News as a correspondent for the short-lived news magazine Now with Tom Brokaw and Katie Couric.

==== Dateline NBC ====
Hansen's notable work for Dateline includes coverage of the Columbine High School massacre, the Oklahoma City bombing, the Unabomber and the TWA Flight 800 disaster, and investigative reports on Indian child slave labor and counterfeit prescription drug sales in China. Hansen was responsible for most of Dateline's coverage of the September 11 attacks, as well as stories on terrorist groups and the operations of Al-Qaeda. He also exposed how a group linked to Osama bin Laden had attempted to buy missiles and nuclear weapons components, and he also worked on an exclusive report on the Air France Flight 8969 hijacking. His series on deficient airport security resulted in the Federal Aviation Administration investigating and ultimately revising its policies.

==== To Catch a Predator ====
In conjunction with the website Perverted-Justice, Hansen hosted a series of Dateline NBC reports under the title To Catch a Predator. Volunteers from Perverted-Justice impersonated minors such as pre-teens to young-mid teenagers (usually 11–15 years old) in chat rooms online and agreed to meet with adults for sex. The meeting places were "sting houses", where camera crews from NBC, and in later episodes local police, awaited potential sexual predators.

Capitalizing on the success of Hansen and his Predator investigations, Dateline NBC created three Tuesday night spin-offs of its original concept; Hansen hosted To Catch a Con Man and To Catch an I.D. Thief. In March 2007, Hansen's book, To Catch a Predator: Protecting Your Kids from Online Enemies Already in Your Home, was released in the American market.

In August 2013, NBC decided not to renew its contract with Hansen, ultimately ending his tenure of 20 years.

=== 2015–present: Career post-NBC ===
==== Independent television shows ====
In 2015, Hansen hosted Killer Instinct, a show on Investigation Discovery chronicling homicide cases. The show's initial 10-episode season premiered on August 17, 2015.

In 2015, Hansen planned a new independent television show called Hansen vs. Predator, a spin-off of his original show To Catch a Predator. The program was intended to premiere online, crowdfunded via Kickstarter with Hansen hoping to raise $400,000; however the Kickstarter only raised $89,000. Hansen offered promotional memorabilia as part of the campaign that donors claimed to have never received, and he was arrested in January 2019 for paying for $13,000 worth of promotional items with a bad check. Later broadcast rights were sold, with Hansen vs. Predator becoming a recurring segment on Crime Watch Daily.

==== Work with Crime Watch Daily ====
On August 22, 2016, Hansen was introduced as the new host of the syndicated news program Crime Watch Daily beginning with its second-season premiere on September 12. Hansen anchored the program from New York City while the program maintained its Los Angeles–based newsroom. The second season also saw the premiere of Hansen vs. Predator, a revival of his previous To Catch a Predator series. Hansen's entry brought further ratings gains to the program, with household ratings increasing by 20% to 1.0, and a 23% gain among women 18–34. On January 4, 2017, Crime Watch Daily was renewed for a third season. The show ended its run in June 2018. Chris Hansen debuted the first episode of Hansen vs. Predator on September 12, 2016, on Crime Watch Daily.

==== Have a Seat with Chris Hansen ====
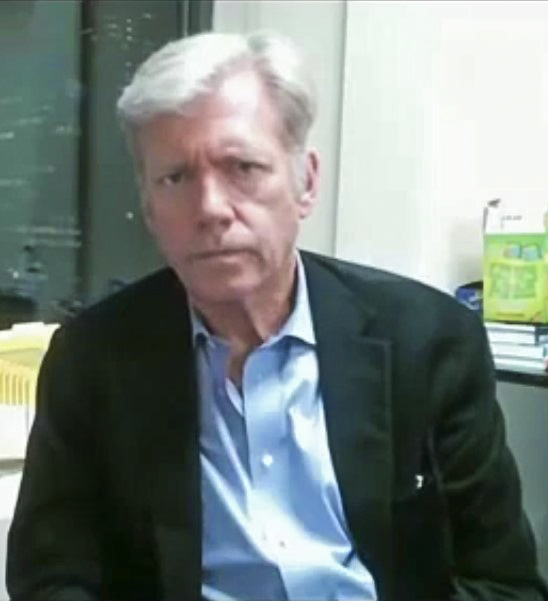
Hansen in 2019

On October 9, 2019, Hansen started a YouTube channel under the name Have a Seat with Chris Hansen, featuring weekly podcasts tackling different topics and interviews with special guests. In 2019, this channel investigated claims of pedophilia and grooming against YouTube creator James Jackson, commonly known as Onision. In January 2020, Hansen visited Jackson's home in an attempt to interview him. Jackson called the police on Hansen, though the police did not take action against him. Jackson also filed a lawsuit against Hansen, which took place on January 24, 2020. Jackson later voluntarily dismissed the claims, claiming that he was advised to consider an "alternative, more effective legal action". This dismissal request was granted.

==== Unseamly & Takedown with Chris Hansen ====
Hansen was named as an executive producer for Unseamly: The Investigation of Peter Nygård, a Discovery+ show which examines Peter Nygård's life from his birth to his downfall and arrest.

Hansen returned to television in 2022 with the series Takedown with Chris Hansen on his streaming service TruBlu, which once more finds him investigating and interviewing online predators. The show granted him greater creative control, allowing him to use profanity and work further with local law enforcement entities.

==== Podcasting ====
Since 2020, Hansen has hosted a podcast called Predators I've Caught in which he revisits the various predator investigations he has conducted from his perspective, in addition to offering any new information regarding the suspects of the investigations and answering submitted questions. Each installment covers a different investigation, with episodes released on a weekly basis.

==== Dangerous Games: Investigating Roblox ====
In August 2025, in the wake of the Roblox Schlep ban controversy in which the YouTuber Schlep was banned from Roblox for conducting stings on alleged child predators, rumors spread on social media that Chris Hansen would create a project focusing on the state of child safety on Roblox. Hansen confirmed the rumors on August 15, stating that he had interviewed law enforcement, abuse victims, and Schlep for a documentary film. Chris Hansen was interviewed by Schlep on August 22 about the documentary. During the discussion, he praised Schlep for his efforts against alleged child predators and said that he had "expanded on his plans" for the documentary. The documentary, Dangerous Games: Investigating Roblox — A Chris Hansen Special, was released on February 27, 2026 on the streaming platform TruBlu.

== Personal life ==
Hansen married his first wife, Mary Joan, in 1989, and raised two sons with her.

Mary Joan filed for divorce in 2018 after nearly thirty years of marriage; the couple divorced in 2020.

Hansen maintained a New York City apartment; however, in January 2019 it was reported that he was evicted after failing to pay rent for the apartment since the previous August.

Hansen's mother, Patricia Hansen, died on March 1, 2020.

On November 13, 2021, Hansen married his second wife, Gabrielle Gagnon.

=== Legal issues ===
In January 2019, Hansen was charged with larceny after multiple checks he had written to a vendor who delivered promotional items bounced. Hansen turned himself in to police in Connecticut on January 14, 2019, for allegedly bouncing checks for nearly $13,000 worth of promotional materials, according to Stamford Police. The charges were dropped after a fan of Hansen's—who had never met him—paid off the amount owed.

In relation to a sting operation that occurred in October 2020, Hansen was subpoenaed to appear and present evidence in a Shiawassee County courtroom in Michigan on July 1, 2021. Hansen did not appear, and so a warrant was issued for his arrest. Hansen turned himself in the next day, stating that his failure to appear in court was because of a misunderstanding, and the matter was resolved.

== Awards and honors ==
Hansen has received 10 Emmy Awards for his work in investigative reporting, outstanding coverage of a news story and outstanding coverage of breaking news.

He has received 5 Edward R. Murrow Awards for his news series investigating aviation security and safety as well as his coverage of the Ford/Firestone case.

He has won three Clarion awards for his coverage of aviation security, Indian child slave labor and the Unabomber case, also receiving a first place medal for an undercover investigation of airport security.

Hansen has also been presented the Overseas Press Club award, an IRE award, the National Press Club award, and the International Consortium of Investigative Journalists award, as well as awards for excellence from the Associated Press and United Press International, also receiving numerous Headliner awards. In 2015 The KidSafe Foundation honored Hansen with their Child Advocate of the year award, for raising awareness among the dangers of online child predators.

== Appearances ==
Hansen has appeared on such television programs as The Daily Show with Jon Stewart, The Tonight Show with Jay Leno, Late Night with Conan O'Brien, The Adam Carolla Show, Today, Scarborough Country, The Oprah Winfrey Show, The Rise Guys Morning Show, The Don and Mike Show, The Opie and Anthony Radio Show, Jimmy Kimmel Live!, Jesse Watters Primetime, Glenn Beck Program, and Diggnation.

On January 9, 2007, Hansen appeared on the BET news series American Gangster. The special, which was hosted by actor Ving Rhames, focused on Detroit drug lords, the Chambers Brothers gang. Hansen gave insight into the lives of the brothers based on the reporting he had done on them in the 1980s and 1990s as a reporter for ABC affiliate WXYZ (Channel 7) and NBC affiliate WDIV (Channel 4).

Hansen hosted CrimeCon's 2026 Clue Awards.

== In popular culture ==
=== In television ===
In the 2008 South Park episode "Le Petit Tourette", Eric Cartman links up with a parody version of Hansen to do a feature on his fake Tourette syndrome. Cartman agrees to interview with the intention of spouting hate speech on air, but once he realizes that he's lost the ability to censor himself after keeping the schtick going for so long he attempts to back out. Hansen then intimidates Cartman into going ahead with it by recounting an incident where a predator backed out of the To Catch a Predator series by shooting himself.

=== In film ===
Hansen featured in the documentary film Predators (2025), which covers To Catch a Predator, the imitations it inspired, and Hansen's subsequent work in true crime entertainment, including his founding of TruBlu. Hansen received the film positively. Hansen also appeared in independent filmmaker Mike Clum's documentary The Sick Mind of EDP445 (2026), in which he interviewed Bryant Moreland, known online as EDP445, a former YouTuber who lost his career after he was caught trying to meet minors for sex. Following admissions made in the documentary, the Kern County District Attorney's Office reviewed the case and filed a criminal complaint against Moreland. He was arrested shortly after.

Robert Pattinson portrayed Hansen in Lance Oppenheim's film Primetime (2026), which focuses on the origins of To Catch a Predator and its rise in television ratings. The film was released on September 25, 2026 by A24. It was partly based on a 2009 Esquire article, "Tonight on Dateline This Man Will Die", which focused on the 2006 suicide of Bill Conradt. Hansen called the film "an insult to the thousands of men and women who work hard every day to protect children from predators." Hansen also told The Washington Post that he and Pattinson never met or talked about the role.
