= To Catch a Predator =

American reality television series

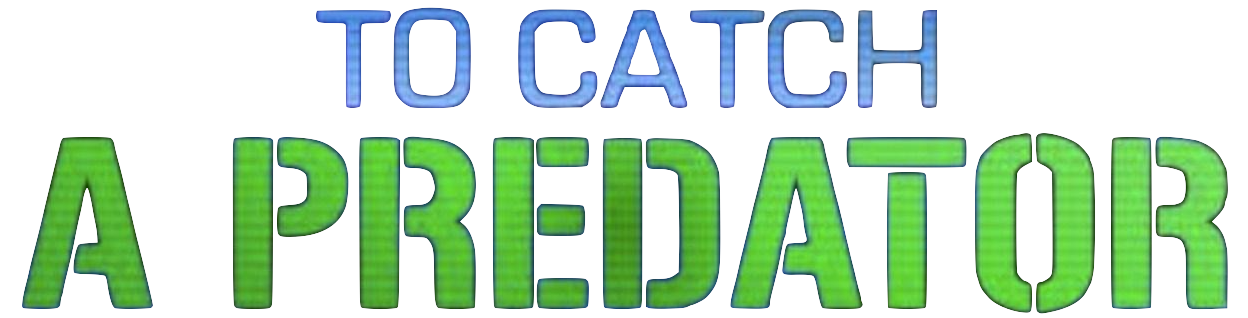
- Presented by: Chris Hansen
- Country of origin: United States
- Original language: English
- No. of seasons: 1
- No. of episodes: 20

Production
- Producer: David Corvo
- Running time: 44 minutes

Original release
- Network: NBC
- Release: November 11, 2004 – December 28, 2007

Related
- Crime Watch Daily

To Catch a Predator is an American reality television series in the television news magazine program Dateline NBC. The program features confrontations by host Chris Hansen, partly filmed with a hidden camera, with adult men arriving at a sting house to have sex with a minor. The men are typically arrested as a result, with the minors being adults impersonating underage persons in online chats.

The series premiered in November 2004. It followed twelve undercover sting operations as they were conducted across the United States with the watchdog group Perverted-Justice. Following the third investigation, law enforcement and other officials became involved, leading to the arrests of most individuals caught. Upon its airing, the series received mixed reactions for its sordid tone, and the ethical and legal concerns raised over the nature of the sting operations it depicted, in particular potential violations of entrapment laws.

The show was cancelled in 2008 following the suicide of Rockwall County, Texas, assistant district attorney Bill Conradt as police attempted to serve him with a search warrant after he was caught talking to and exchanging pictures with a Perverted-Justice volunteer posing as a 13-year-old boy. Conradt fatally shot himself as police and an NBC camera crew entered his home, an act that was captured by the filming crew. His estate sued Dateline for $105 million, then settled out of court. Hansen stated that To Catch a Predator ended because it had simply run its course, though he later ran a Kickstarter campaign to relaunch the series. In 2016, a spiritual successor program called Hansen vs. Predator became a recurring segment on Crime Watch Daily, a syndicated television news magazine hosted by Hansen. A second spiritual successor, Takedown with Chris Hansen, premiered in 2022 and currently airs on the TruBlu streaming network.

Reruns of the Dateline segments are occasionally broadcast on MS NOW. NBC affiliates WTMJ in Milwaukee, KSHB in Kansas City, and WBRE in Wilkes-Barre have also produced local versions of To Catch a Predator. Various spin-offs have aired in the same format, including To Catch a Con Man, To Catch an ID Thief, To Catch a Car Thief, and To Catch an i-Jacker, which featured iPod thieves. To Catch a Predator is also aired on FX and Crime & Investigation in the United Kingdom, the Crime & Investigation Network in Australia and New Zealand, and Fox Crime in Portugal.

== History and format ==
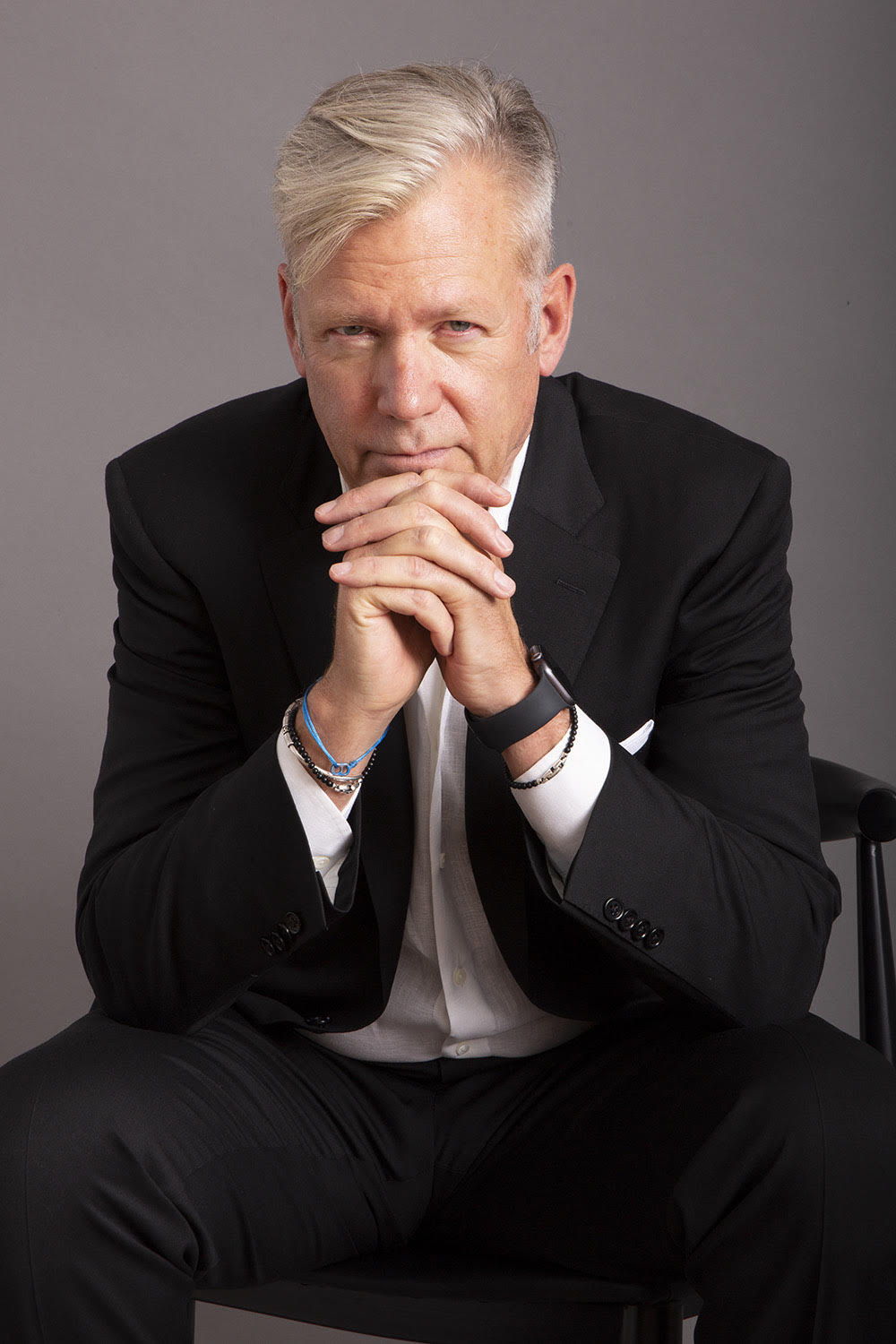
Host Chris Hansen pictured in 2021

To Catch a Predator began as a series of segments on the American NBC news magazine/reality show Dateline NBC, premiering under the title Dangerous Web in 2004. In its four years of production, it grew to become the most popular segment on Dateline, its cultural status underlined by satirical references in parodies and other comedies, such as The Simpsons, 30 Rock, and Conan O'Brien's opening sketch at the 58th Primetime Emmy Awards in 2006.

The show's host Chris Hansen clarified in an interview with NPR News that the subjects confronted on the show should be labelled properly as potential sexual predators and not as pedophiles. Hansen stated, "Pedophiles have a very specific definition, people who are interested in prepubescent sex."

The first two investigations did not include law enforcement officers on site, and individuals caught in the sting were allowed to leave voluntarily, though Dateline provided all video and transcripts to law enforcement and suspects were eventually arrested. Arrests are sometimes made in a dramatic fashion by multiple officers who, with Tasers drawn, ambush the suspect and command him to lie face-down on the ground before being handcuffed. In the Fort Myers investigation, a police officer in camouflage sometimes arrested the perpetrators as they left the sting house. Tasers are sometimes shown being used to subdue fleeing or merely unresponsive individuals.

The show was cancelled in 2008. In an interview with Time magazine, Hansen stated that the show had simply run its course.

== Investigations ==
=== Bethpage, New York ===
The first installment drew 18 men throughout two and a half days to a sting house in Bethpage, New York. One of the men arrested in the series' 2004 investigation, Ryan Hogan, was a New York City firefighter, assigned to Engine Company 237 in Brooklyn. Hogan used a firehouse computer while on duty in an attempt to lure a Perverted-Justice agent who was posing as a teenage girl to have sex with him. On June 8, 2006, Hogan pleaded guilty to putting obscene photos of himself on the Internet, as part of a plea agreement. He was sentenced to five years of probation, continued psychological treatment, and submission to random polygraph tests.

=== Herndon, Virginia ===
An hour-long special that premiered in November 2005 depicted an operation in Herndon, Virginia, in the suburbs of Washington, D.C., and saw 19 men arrive over three days. Among the men caught were a rabbi, Rabbi David Kaye, an emergency room doctor, Dr. Jeffrey Beck, and an elementary school teacher, Steven Bennof, who lost their jobs after taping. One of the more memorable predators caught included a man by the name of John Kennelly, who arrived at the sting house naked and was caught by Dateline the very next day at a McDonald's in Arlington, Virginia trying to meet another decoy.

=== Mira Loma, California ===
Fifty-one men were caught in Mira Loma, California, over the course of three days, a record number for the entire series.

=== Greenville, Ohio ===
The premise behind the fourth Dateline investigation was to see if internet predators were as big a problem in small towns as in big cities, so Dateline set up operations in Greenville, Ohio. In total, 18 men were arrested over three days between March 24 and 26, 2006.

=== Fort Myers, Florida ===
By June 30, 2009, all the cases stemming from investigations in Fort Myers, Florida, made it through the court system. Of the 24 men captured as a result of the investigation, 20 were convicted of using the Internet to solicit a child for sex. The 20 sentenced men were ordered to register as sex offenders for the rest of their lives. Among them included a Sunday school teacher, Brian Emmons, a teen mental health counselor; Peter Ernandez, a youth counselor and medical student who was studying to be a pediatrician, who stripped naked; Marvin Lakhan, Fredi Fernandez, a security guard at the Miami National airport, as well as Clifford Wallach, a man who brought his son to the house. Most of them were also put on sex offender probation.

=== Fortson (Columbus), Georgia ===
The sheriff's department in Harris County, Georgia, had arrested 20 men over four-and-a-half days in a sting operation in Fortson, a suburb of Columbus.

Shortly after the first half of this investigation aired, the Georgia Governor's office announced a new Child Safety Initiative which would triple the number of special agents in the Georgia Bureau of Investigation dedicated to catching Internet predators and double the number of forensic computer specialists dedicated to helping prosecute computer crimes.

=== Petaluma, California ===
In January 2010, Lt. Matthew Stapleton of the Police Department of Petaluma, California, credited a To Catch a Predator sting operation with scaring potential predators away from Petaluma. Referring to later decoy operations by local police, Stapleton said, "As soon as they found out that we were from the Petaluma area, they completely cut off communication with us."

However, after six days of testimony, a judge threw out the case against one of the defendants and criticized the tactics used by Dateline's partner, Perverted-Justice, for engaging in entrapment.

=== Long Beach, California ===
To Catch a Predator's eighth investigation was a two-part special shot in Long Beach, California. The investigation resulted in the arrest of 38 men, one of whom had previously appeared in the Riverside County investigation.

=== Murphy, Texas ===
The ninth investigation was shot in Murphy, Texas, just outside of Dallas. 25 men were caught at the sting lasting four days. The apprehended included a former church music director and a former police officer in his 60s. The charges for this investigation were later dropped.

=== Flagler Beach, Florida ===
The tenth investigation in the series was shot in Flagler Beach, Florida. Over the course of four days, 21 men were arrested, including a police officer who brought several guns. In one of the cases, a judge ordered Chris Hansen to testify at a deposition about what he witnessed.

=== Mantoloking, New Jersey ===
The penultimate investigation was shot in Mantoloking, New Jersey; the wealthiest municipality in the state.

=== Bowling Green, Kentucky ===
When Dateline conducted an investigation in Bowling Green, Kentucky, only seven men showed up to the decoy house, a sharp decline from previous Dateline investigations. The men arrested include a man with cerebral palsy and a man who claimed to be a police detective, who was tasered due to his claim that he had brought a gun with him. The taser probes failed to stick, so police chased him into the house, where he was subdued. It was later discovered that he was no longer a police officer at the time and had actually been fired. All men arrested faced five to ten years in prison if convicted.

== Suicide of Bill Conradt ==
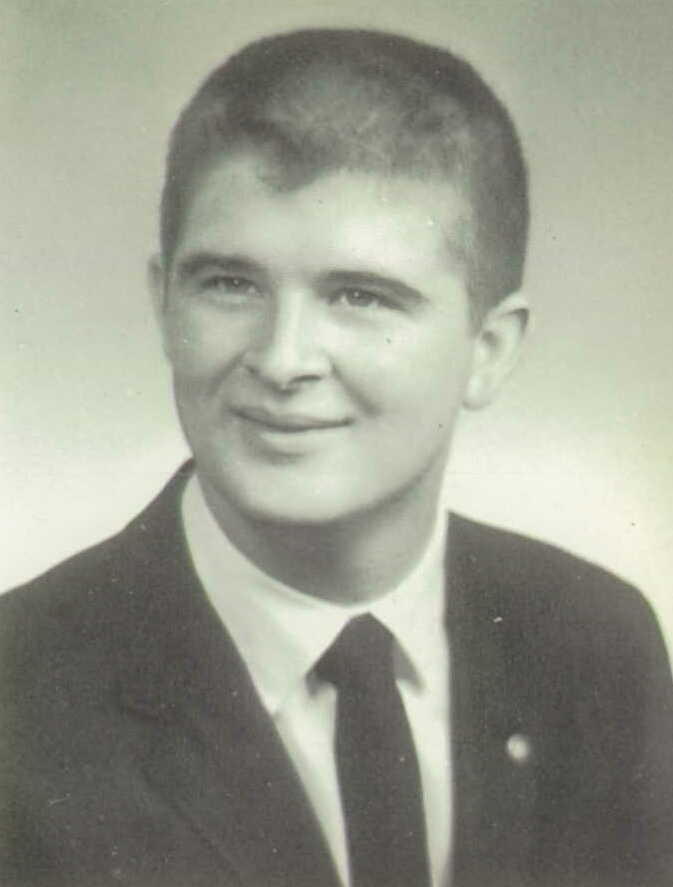
Conradt pictured as a high school student

In November 2006, Perverted-Justice announced that another To Catch a Predator sting had been conducted with law enforcement in Murphy, Texas. There were 25 men who arrived at the location on Mandeville Drive over four days, with law enforcement investigating additional suspects that did not arrive. These additional suspects, who conducted chats but did not arrive at the undercover house, included Kaufman County assistant district attorney Bill Conradt, who shot and killed himself on November 5, 2006, at his home when police attempted to serve him with a search warrant. Conradt had been caught talking to and exchanging pictures with a Perverted-Justice volunteer posing as a 13-year-old boy. After Conradt failed to appear at a prearranged meeting, NBC and local police tracked him to his home. Conradt killed himself as police and an NBC camera crew entered his home, capturing the scene when the fatal shot was fired. His estate, managed by his sister Patricia Conradt, later sued Dateline for US$105 million. The case was eventually settled out of court for an undisclosed sum.

=== Reaction ===
The sting prompted protests from local residents, who were opposed to law enforcement officials purposely attracting sexual predators to their neighborhood. Others countered that these predators and sex offenders were already in the area (or close by) and that this sting revealed many of them to be government employees. NBC broadcast this investigation on February 13 and 20, 2007. Prior to the settlement of Patricia Conradt's lawsuit against NBC Universal Inc, portions from the February 20, 2007, broadcast of To Catch a Predator were intended to be introduced in civil court.

On June 1, 2007, the Collin County district attorney's office declined to prosecute any of the 23 cases brought against those arrested on this installment of the show, citing insufficient evidence. District Attorney John Roach explained that in 16 of the cases, he had no jurisdiction because the decoys and suspects who participated in the online chats were not in that county when they did so, a point seconded by felony prosecutor Doris Berry in a 2009 Esquire article. Berry also discovered that the Murphy Police Department had done "literally no prior investigation" before making the arrests, thus making most, if not all of them, illegal under Texas law. Furthermore, Roach explained, the involvement of non-professionals tainted many of the cases, stating, "The fact that somebody besides police officers were involved is what makes this case bad. If professionals had been running the show, they would have done a much better job rather than being at the beck and call of outsiders.” The use of a residential neighborhood for the sting was also criticized by those who lived near the house used for the operation, one of whom stated that the speeding up of cars up and down the street and the sprinting of police from hiding spots with guns drawn, which led one suspect to drop a bag of crack cocaine, endangered the neighborhood. Another neighbor commented, "They can chase predators all they want, but they shouldn't do it in a populated area with children, two blocks from an elementary school. This is a family community. It didn't look kosher at all."

On September 5, 2007, Dateline aired the results of the forensic report on Conradt's computer. According to the report, Conradt's "CDs, laptop computers and cell phone all contained pornographic material– some included child pornography." Additional reporting by Esquire in 2009 disputed this claim.

=== Investigation by 20/20 ===
On September 7, 2007, the ABC news magazine 20/20 aired an investigative report into the To Catch a Predator series by ABC News investigative reporter Brian Ross. The report critiqued certain aspects of the specials and also investigated the controversy over Conradt's suicide. In the report, two former police detectives with the Murphy, Texas, Police Department, Sam Love and Walter Weiss, claimed that the decision to arrest Conradt at his home was made by Chris Hansen, a charge NBC denied. Love and Weiss claimed that the NBC News crew had every intention to confront Conradt, and the attorney for Conradt's family charged that Dateline chose to stop at nothing to get Conradt. Love and Weiss also claimed that Conradt's death was shrugged off by many in Murphy's police force, and the two of them left the department in disgust.

Neither NBC News nor Perverted-Justice cooperated with Ross's report. NBC News accused ABC News of using the 20/20 report as a hit piece on the rival news magazine Dateline NBC. NBC News president Steve Capus told USA Today, "I chalk this up to the usual network silly competitiveness, in a territory of a much more serious handling. The competitive wars [for ratings] right now are at a very high level... That's fueling this." The allegations were denied by Ross, who was formerly a reporter for NBC News.

=== Lawsuit ===
In late 2007, Conradt's sister, Patricia Conradt, sued NBC Universal. Similarly to the investigation conducted by 20/20, she stated that the police had raided Conradt's house at the behest of NBC. In January 2008, federal judge Denny Chin dismissed most of Conradt's claims, but found that she had a reasonable chance of proving that NBC had pressed police into engaging in unreasonable and unnecessary tactics solely for entertainment value, thus creating "a substantial risk of suicide or other harm". He also found that Conradt could prove that police disregarded their duty to prevent Conradt from killing himself and that NBC's actions amounted to "conduct so outrageous and extreme that no civilized society should tolerate it". In June 2008, NBC and Patricia Conradt settled the case for an undisclosed sum.

== Episodes ==
This is an episode guide for the television airings of the respective investigations.

No.	Title	Original release date	US viewers (millions)
1	"Bethpage, Long Island"	November 11, 2004	N/A
2	"Suburban Washington, D.C."	November 4, 2005	N/A
3	"Riverside County, California"	February 3, 2006	N/A
4	"Greenville, Ohio, Part 1"	April 26, 2006	N/A
5	"Greenville, Ohio, Part 2"	May 3, 2006	7.95
6	"Fort Myers, Florida, Part 1"	May 10, 2006	10.27
7	"Fort Myers, Florida, Part 2"	May 17, 2006	8.96
8	"Fortson, Georgia, Part 1"	September 13, 2006	N/A
9	"Fortson, Georgia, Part 2"	September 22, 2006	8.71
10	"Petaluma, California, Part 1"	September 29, 2006	8.85
11	"Petaluma, California, Part 2"	October 6, 2006	8.35
12	"Long Beach, California, Part 1"	January 30, 2007	N/A
13	"Long Beach, California, Part 2"	February 6, 2007	N/A
14	"Murphy, Texas, Part 1"	February 13, 2007	N/A
15	"Murphy, Texas, Part 2"	February 20, 2007	N/A
16	"Flagler Beach, Florida, Part 1"	February 27, 2007	N/A
17	"Flagler Beach, Florida, Part 2"	March 6, 2007	N/A
18	"Ocean County, New Jersey, Part 1"	July 18, 2007	N/A
19	"Ocean County, New Jersey, Part 2"	July 25, 2007	N/A
20	"Bowling Green, Kentucky"	December 28, 2007	N/A

== Criticism ==
The series was accused of making news rather than reporting news, blurring the line between being a news organization versus an agency of law enforcement. Among the more prominent critics of the series has been Brian Montopoli of the CBS News Public Eye blog and formerly of the Columbia Journalism Review. Montopoli argues that although Dateline NBC leaves legal punishment up to police and prosecutors, broadcasting the suspects on national television, in the context of exposing criminal behavior, is already a form of punishment which the media have no right to inflict. Montopoli also suggests that NBC News is more concerned about ratings than actually bringing online predators to justice:

But NBC is first and foremost a business, and the producers' motives are not simply altruistic. Perhaps I'm being cynical, but I find it telling that this program has been remade and rerun so often. You could argue that NBC is just making sure as many people as possible are aware predators are out there, but is it too much to think that a little thing called "ratings" might play a part as well?

In the United Kingdom, columnist and television critic Charlie Brooker wrote of the show, "When a TV show makes you feel sorry for potential child-rapists, you know it's doing something wrong". He also commented on the "overpowering whiff of entrapment" and the potential for viewer complicity. Brooker also mentioned the selection process for the actress as being disturbing by adding "Presumably someone at To Catch a Predator HQ sat down with a bunch of audition tapes and spooled through it, trying to find a sexy 18-year-old who could pass for 13. They'll have stared at girl after girl, umming and ahhing over their chest sizes, until they found just the right one. And like I say, she's hot. But if you fancy her, you're a paedophile."

In May 2007, Marsha Bartel, a former investigative producer for Dateline, filed a $1 million breach of contract lawsuit against NBC, stating that the network fired her the year prior, with three years left on her four-year contract, and after 21 years at the company, after she refused to work on To Catch a Predator because of ethical concerns she had about the series. Specifically, she said that Perverted-Justice failed to keep accurate, verifiable records of its online interactions with suspects, which had been cited by some of the arrested men's attorneys who argued they were victims of entrapment. NBC, however, stated that Bartel was terminated because of budget cutbacks. The lawsuit was dismissed in October 2007. Federal Judge John W. Darrah explained that under New York law, NBC has the legal right to dismiss employees without notification. NBC reacted to the outcome by issuing a statement that read "We believed from the beginning that this case was without merit and we are pleased with the judge's decision." In September 2008, the Seventh Circuit Court of Appeals upheld the judgment on appeal.

=== Entrapment claims ===
Entrapment is a practice where a law enforcement agent induces a person to commit a criminal offense that the person would have otherwise been unlikely or unwilling to commit. It can be used as a legal defense for actions committed by the government but does not apply to investigative actions taken by a purely private organization.

Although entrapment does not ordinarily apply to actions taken by private organizations, when Perverted-Justice works sufficiently in concert with a law enforcement agency, the involvement of the state actor may allow for an entrapment defense. Perverted-Justice takes the position that it has precautions in place to avoid entrapment issues, claiming that volunteers never initiate contact with the target or instigate lewd conversations or talks of sexual meetings. However, former Dateline anchor Stone Phillips disputes that claim, arguing that, "In many cases, the decoy is the first to bring up the subject of sex." Phillips defended the tactic as enticement as opposed to entrapment, stating that, "Once the hook is baited, the fish jump and run with it like you wouldn't believe."

After a sting operation conducted by Perverted-Justice with the Riverside County Sheriff's Department, a court rejected a defendant's entrapment defense, finding no evidence to support the claim that Perverted-Justice acted as an agent of law enforcement. The conviction was affirmed on appeal, which noted the trial court's observation that the defendant initiated the contact with a Perverted-Justice agent that he had thought was a 12-year-old girl.

In 2011, a case against a man who had appeared on the show was dismissed because the trial court judge did not find proof of a specific intent to commit the crime. The judge criticized the tactics used by Perverted-Justice, which he suggested lacked credibility and constituted entrapment.

=== Charges dropped ===
In June 2007, Perverted-Justice was criticized following a sting operation in Collin County, Texas, after charges against 23 suspected online sex predators were dropped. Collin County Assistant District Attorney Greg Davis claimed the cases were dropped after Perverted-Justice failed to provide enough usable evidence that crimes were committed within the county's jurisdiction. Perverted-Justice responded by stating that the district attorney's office was changing its explanation for dropping the charges and "could not defend the claim that the evidence was 'inadequate'".

=== Conflict of interest ===
Beginning with the fourth investigation, Dateline began paying Perverted-Justice a consultant's fee to do its regular work; the fee was reported to have been over $100,000 for that operation. Al Tompkins of the Poynter Institute for Media Studies suggested that this payment created a potential conflict of interest for Perverted-Justice, an organization run largely on the efforts of volunteers, and furthermore, that for Dateline to pay this fee would be tantamount to paying news sources, a practice widely frowned upon in the journalism industry.

The department kept itself separate from Dateline staff during the sting as well, to avoid legal hassles later on, says Burns. Officials were positioned in a location near but not inside the house where offenders arrived for meetings. Communications and video equipment permitted authorities to keep tabs on what transpired, and all chats were transmitted directly to officials as they took place. "We didn't want to blur the line of ethics between law enforcement and the media," Burns explained. "We didn't even speak to Dateline officials during the operations."

The potential for conflict of interest was one of several concerns that led to the non-prosecution of 23 cases in Collin County, Texas. District Attorney John Roach questioned circumstances of the May 2007 sting, stating: "What is exactly the deal between the City of Murphy and NBC? What is the deal between NBC and Perverted-Justice? Who's getting paid what? Who has an axe to grind?" Investigative journalist Byron Harris explained, "John Roach knew the money issue would come up in court as part of the required disclosure of benefits received by possible witnesses."

=== Staged versions ===
The series inspired a trend of YouTube prankster videos produced by individuals emulating To Catch a Predator as a form of social justice activism, without police involvement or legal qualifications. In these videos, when the sting is revealed to the would-be predator lured to the sting, unlike To Catch a Predator, the YouTubers scold the alleged perpetrator and allow them to leave. These videos were debunked as fake, and not actual stings of alleged criminals, which resulted in criticism and mockery by others in the YouTube community, and led some of the content creators behind them to quit YouTube entirely. Sarah Manavis, writing for New Statesman, criticized these videos, which garnered high viewerships and brand sponsorships, saying, "If the videos are, indeed, entirely staged, then we have a problem of YouTubers lying to their audiences whilst simultaneously self-aggrandising their own actions – painting themselves as white knights when, in reality, they’re just paying actors to make them look like heroes. But if the whole thing is in fact actually real, the YouTubers are literally letting child predators head off after almost committing a violent crime – managing to both find a child predator and equally letting them get away without any legal consequences."

== Similar projects ==
In April 2015, Hansen announced the start of a Kickstarter campaign to fund an online spiritual successor to To Catch a Predator.

At the time of the Fairfield sting, Hansen reported that he was commencing negotiations with various potential broadcast partners in an effort to find a media platform on which to air the footage that was shot during the Fairfield operation. In mid-2016, Hansen became the host of the syndicated television news magazine Crime Watch Daily, with Hansen vs. Predator installments being broadcast as a recurring segment on that show.

In 2020, Czech documentary film Caught in the Net had its premiere. The film documents three actresses pretending to be adolescent girls on social media who are contacted by sexual predators that try to seduce them and start sending them photos of their genitalia. Sexual predators appearing in the film attracted focus of police after the release of the film and some were arrested and criminally charged.

Hansen returned to television in 2022 with the series Takedown with Chris Hansen on his streaming service TruBlu, which once more finds him investigating and interviewing online predators. The show granted him greater creative control, allowing him to use profanity and work further with local law enforcement entities.

== In other media ==
A spin-off book, To Catch a Predator: Protecting Your Children from Online Enemies Already in Your Home, was published in 2007.

David Osit's 2025 documentary Predators chronicles the rise and fall of To Catch A Predator and interviews Hansen about his aims. It received universal acclaim from critics.

Lance Oppenheim's 2026 film Primetime is loosely based on the behind the scenes production of To Catch a Predator, with Robert Pattinson starring as Hansen. It debuted in competition at the 83rd Venice International Film Festival and was released by A24 in the United States on September 25, 2026.

== See also ==
- Anti-pedophile activism
- Ephebophilia
- Hebephilia
- Jailbait
- Online predator
- Perp walk
- Public humiliation
- Reaction formation
- Roblox–Schlep controversy
