= Suicide of Bill Conradt =

2006 death of American assistant district attorney

- Dallas–Fort Worth metroplex, Texas
- Date: November 5, 2006
- Location: 201 Davidson Drive Terrell, Texas, U.S.
- Type: Suicide precluding arrest
- Motive: Psychological distress caused by investigation and to avoid legal prosecution for child sex offenses
- Participants: Bill Conradt; Dateline NBC; Murphy police; Perverted-Justice; Terrell police
- Outcome: Undisclosed lawsuit settled out of court in June 2008 • cancellation of new episodes of To Catch a Predator
- Deaths: 1 (Bill Conradt)

Louis William Conradt Jr., an American local assistant district attorney in the Dallas–Fort Worth metroplex, died by suicide via gunshot on Sunday, November 5, 2006, when Texas police served him with search and arrest warrants stemming from an online sting of men soliciting sexual acts from underage teenagers by NBC News crime show Dateline NBC, for their program To Catch a Predator, and anti-pedophile group Perverted-Justice.

Perverted-Justice (PJ) and Dateline conducted their sting, attracting men to a bait house in Murphy, Texas. Conradt was one of the men who solicited the PJ volunteer masquerading as a minor, but did not travel to Murphy. Instead, a group of police, Dateline, and PJ personnel executed inaccurate arrest and search warrants at Conradt's home in Terrell, Texas. After SWAT breached the house, Conradt shot himself.

The suicide was another point of contention over To Catch a Predator's three-party relationship between law enforcement, civilian, and the news media. Police were criticized for improperly executing their duties in the service of ratings, and NBC was criticized for leading police operations at the expense of safety and justice. Ultimately, there continue to be unresolved conflicting claims from both the people involved in the sting, and the investigative journalists who have researched and reported on it.

A $105 million wrongful death lawsuit brought by Conradt's sister was settled out of court, and none of the other men arrested in the sting were prosecuted. The 2026 film Primetime dramatizes Conradt’s suicide, with Alex Winter portraying Conradt.

== Background ==
=== To Catch a Predator ===
To Catch a Predator was a recurrent feature on the TV news magazine Dateline NBC. Hosted by Chris Hansen, it premiered in late 2004, and was an immediate ratings success. For upwards of $100,000 per episode, the production hired the vigilante group Perverted-Justice to assist in the "exposure [and] arrest of men ostensibly interested in having sex with young teenagers." Perverted-Justice entered chat rooms and posed as teenagers to attract such men to a sting operation. By early 2007, the segment had been praised by the United States Congress, and Dateline's own records counted 238 apprehensions and 36 guilty verdicts (15%).

David M. Granger, the editor-in-chief of Esquire, told the Houston Chronicle that the suspects seen on To Catch a Predator were being denied due process by conviction in the court of public opinion before they might see the inside of a courtroom to face their accusers. By early 2006, the segment had been repeatedly criticized for ethical and journalistic concerns, and a Dateline producer told Radar magazine that, "one of these guys is going to go home and shoot himself in the head." Producer Allan Maraynes countered, saying that those involved "believe we're doing the socially responsible thing ... and the journalistically responsible thing."

=== Bill Conradt ===
Bill Conradt
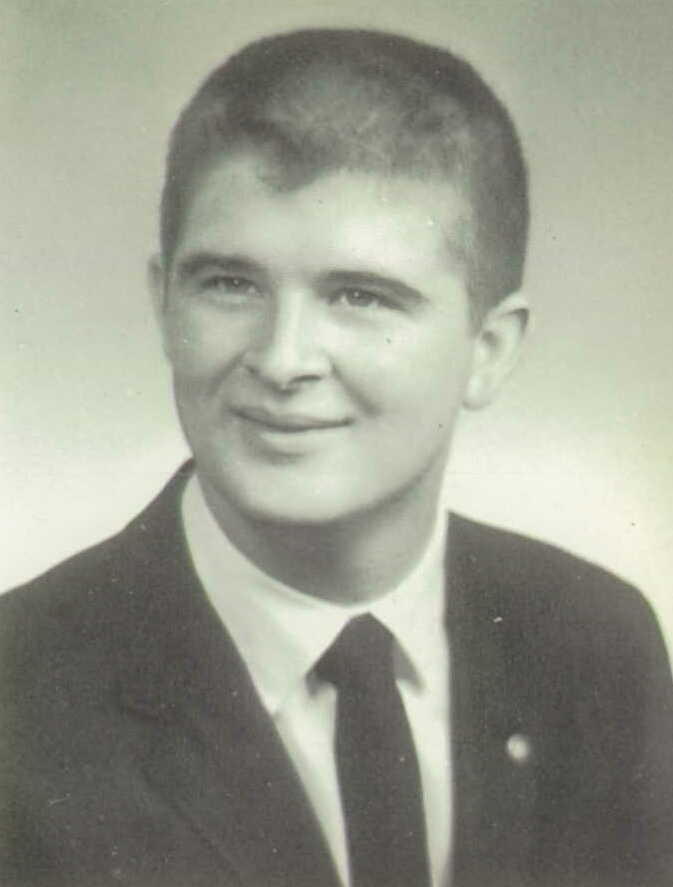
- Conradt in his 1968 high-school yearbook
- Born: Louis William Conradt Jr. January 30, 1950; Kaufman County, Texas, U.S.
- Died: November 5, 2006 (aged 56); Parkland Memorial Hospital; Dallas, Texas, U.S.
- Cause of death: Suicide by gunshot
- Other name: Louis Conradt
- Education: University of Texas at Austin; Texas Tech University (JD)
- Occupations: District attorney; lawyer
- Political party: Democratic

District attorney for Kaufman County, Texas
- In office 1980–2002

Louis William Conradt Jr. was born on January 30, 1950, in Kaufman County, Texas, to Montie Estelle King and Louis William Conradt. Conradt Jr. graduated from Terrell High School in 1968, where he was president of his senior class. He received his undergraduate degree from the University of Texas, and his Juris Doctor from Texas Tech University. His friends described him as a predictable, reserved man. By 2006, he was still unmarried, and living in the Terrell, Texas, home at 201 Davidson Drive in which he had grown up.

Conradt was the district attorney (DA) of Kaufman County from 1980 to 2002, at which time he made an unsuccessful campaign for election to a district judgeship as a Democrat. Afterwards, he worked in private practice, and by 2006 he was working as the chief felony assistant district attorney (ADA) for Rockwall County, Texas. Conradt's coworkers and courtroom opponents described him as a good prosecutor with a "near photographic memory for the law".

== Sting ==
In July 2006, Perverted-Justice (PJ) approached the Murphy, Texas, police department (PD) about working together. A July 24 joint sting netted the suspect's Ford Expedition as the police chief's new official vehicle. When PJ suggested a larger operation with To Catch a Predator, Chief Billy Myrick eagerly seized the opportunity. The Collin County, Texas district attorney, John Roach, refused to participate; he wrote an explanatory letter to the Murphy Police to "serve as a wake-up call to Chief Myrick, giving the chief an out." Local residents protested the planned operation to attract predators to their neighborhood.

In the first days of November 2006, a Dateline NBC/Perverted-Justice sting was orchestrated in Murphy without informing the mayor or city council. With decorations added for the just-passed Halloween holiday, a house in a wealthier neighborhood was outfitted with multiple live audio–video feeds. The headquarters for Murphy PD was about one mile (1.6 km) away, and NBC took over a room there to install high-tech equipment for remote live monitoring of the house's streams; Murphy officers referred to the room as "NORAD" and "the War Room".

On November 3, operatives posed as teenagers online to attract men to the house, and an indeterminate number were arrested after entering. Jimmy Patterson was an off-duty police detective from Rowlett, Texas, hired by NBC to protect the civilians involved, earning an hourly rate of $35 (equivalent to $55.9 in 2025); he later detailed many mistakes made by the small-town Murphy police, including hyper-aggressive crossfire situations when arresting suspects. Chief Myrick thought the operation was extremely successful, hoping the Dateline exposure would bring national attention to Murphy, and repeatedly joking about seizing the nice cars of arrested suspects.

Conradt no doubt knew that statute 33.021 in the Texas penal code description of the crime of "online solicitation of a minor" states that an adult offends when he "communicates in a sexually explicit manner with a minor," and defines "minor" as anyone who represents himself or herself as being under the age of seventeen.

— Luke Dittrich, Esquire

For weeks before the sting, a PJ volunteer posing as a 13-year-old boy had been chatting online with "inxs00", a man who claimed to be a college student and had sent a sexually explicit photo. On November 4, an NBC voice actor made telephone contact with the pseudonymous man, who ultimately provided personal information that identified him as Conradt. Dateline and Perverted-Justice both later published allegations that Conradt began deleting content from his MySpace account that night; Esquire later said this was untrue. Detective Patterson was acquainted with Conradt, but could not conclusively confirm his voice from Dateline's tapes, "wasn't at all sure that the necessary precautions would be taken", and was told by the show's lead producer that he could not inform his police chief about the Conradt situation.

When Conradt stopped communicating with the PJ and NBC personnel, and it became apparent he was not traveling to the Murphy house, Dateline decided for the first time to take the investigation to the suspect's house. It was 12:30 a.m. on November 5 when Hansen asked police for the favor of securing arrest and search warrants for Conradt, saying that "if he won't come to us, we'll go to him." The intent was to ambush Conradt in Terrell to fulfill the To Catch a Predator formula. Chief Myrick agreed, and rushed both warrants, forgoing any interagency coordination with the Texas Rangers, Collin County DA, or a grand jury inquiry. The arrest warrant was ready by 11:00 a.m.

=== Suicide ===
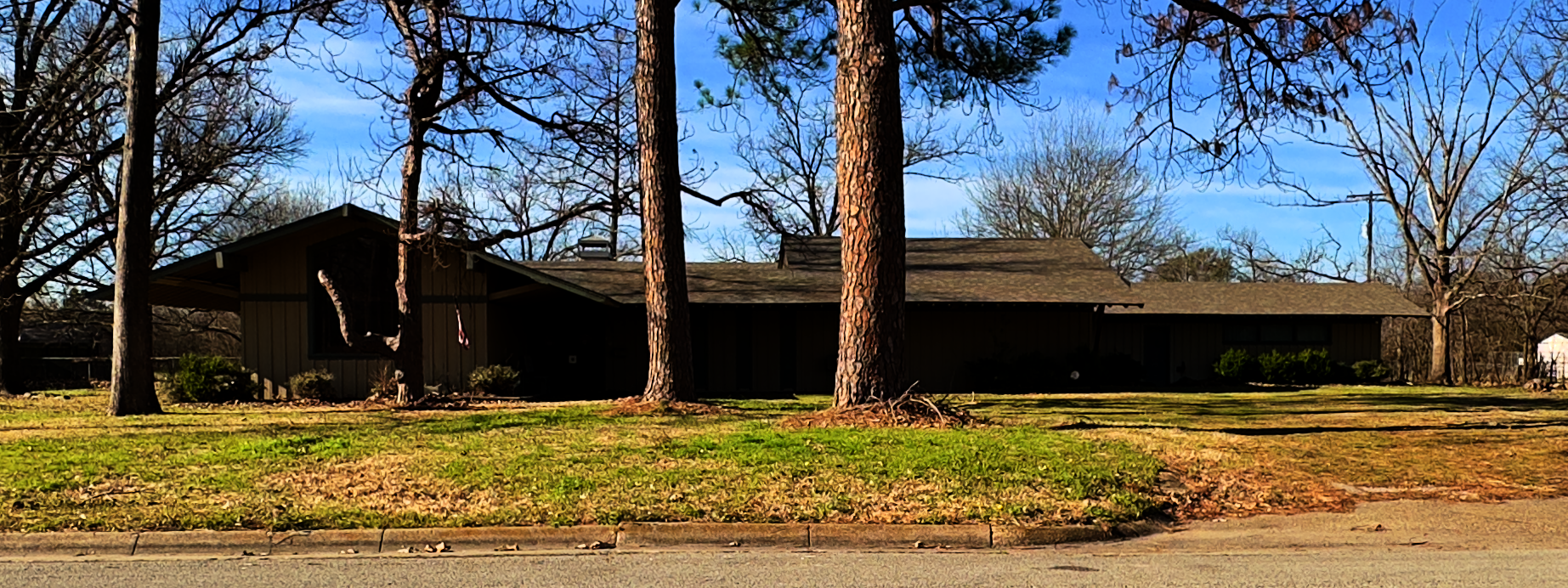
Conradt's house (in 2023)

Chris Hansen and his Dateline television crew arrived at Conradt's Terrell neighborhood at 8:30 a.m. on November 5, hoping to ambush Conradt, trespassing on his property. Murphy and Terrell police arrived hours later. Conradt did not answer officers knocking on the door to his courtyard, and confirmation of the search warrant was received at 2:20 p.m., though it had "the wrong city, county, and date." At the suggestion of a PJ volunteer, a Terrell police sergeant tried calling Conradt, but the ADA did not answer, and the police did not leave a message. At 2:40, the Terrell police chief called in SWAT.

The seven-man SWAT team, led by Ken McKeown, slowly arrived after 3:00 p.m. They breached Conradt's home by forcing open a sliding-glass back door, entering through the den, finding Conradt's computer and a workbook titled Investigation and Prosecution of Child Sexual Abuse (from a recent district attorneys' conference). The team split up, and the half that first saw Conradt at the end of a hallway described his last words as some variation of "I am not gonna hurt anybody." He then shot himself in the head with a Browning .380 pistol and died within 60 minutes.

NBC personnel photographed and videotaped Conradt's body and gun, and they obtained an audiotape of his last words. One of the officers on the scene mugged for a Dateline camera and opined, "That'll make good TV." Conradt was airlifted by CareFlite to Dallas' Parkland Memorial Hospital, where he was pronounced dead.

== Aftermath ==
Immediately after the shooting, Detective Patterson was leaving the bait house in Murphy when local police pulled him over. At gunpoint, they forced him from his truck and handcuffed him. The Dateline contractor had been mistaken for a suspect in the sting who owned the same-colored make and model of truck.

Dateline stated that police took three encrypted computers from Conradt's house, and by February 2007, were coordinating with their manufacturer to unlock the files within. Dateline later aired an episode that said child pornography had been found on Conradt's laptop. Esquire reported that Conradt's Sony VAIO laptop was seized, and forensic analysis proved it was the computer from which Conradt chatted with the PJ volunteer, but it had no illegal material or content that indicated sexual predation. However, an investigation done by the Texas Department of Public Safety concluded that several devices owned by Conradt including multiple laptops, a cellphone, and computer disks "all contained pornographic material (and) some included child pornography".

Murphy's city manager, Craig Sherwood, approved the sting operation, but had not informed the mayor or city council. In mid-June 2007, after furious residents complained about the sting and its dangers—speeding suspects, overzealous arrests with guns drawn, and drugs brought by the suspects—the council voted to fire Sherwood by buying out his contract for $255,000 (equivalent to $396,000 in 2025).

Twenty-three other men were caught in the sting; two were from Murphy. The Collin County district attorney's office found problems with all of the arrests. Firstly, Perverted-Justice did not provide the comprehensive chat logs of their interactions with suspects. Secondly, by the next July, NBC had not provided its video records for use in prosecution. Third, Texas law largely requires that arrestees have an outstanding warrant, but the DA found that the Murphy police were only—at best—acting as agents of Dateline: "merely a player in the show and had no real law-enforcement position. Other people are doing the work, and the police are just there like potted plants, to make the scenery." For an additional 16 of the cases, because neither the suspects nor PJ chatters were in Collin County, the DA had no jurisdictional authority. On June 1, 2007, DA Roach announced that he would not pursue indictments against suspects from the Murphy bait house.

[Dateline NBC] placed itself squarely in the middle of a police operation, pushing the police to engage in tactics that were unnecessary and unwise, solely to generate more dramatic footage for a television show. ... A reasonable jury could find that by doing so, NBC created a substantial risk of suicide or other harm, and that it engaged in conduct so outrageous and extreme that no civilized society should tolerate it.

— Denny Chin, S.D.N.Y.

In July 2007, Conradt's sister Patricia filed a wrongful death lawsuit against NBC Universal for $105 million (equivalent to $163 million in 2025) in the United States District Court for the Southern District of New York. NBC called the lawsuit meritless, and filed for dismissal, but Judge Denny Chin ruled against the broadcaster on the merits of intentional infliction of emotional distress and civil rights violations. NBC said they were going to fight the suit, but on June 24, 2008, the suit was "amicably resolved" for an undisclosed amount.

== Analysis ==
=== By those involved ===
==== Directly ====
Two weeks after Conradt's death, Chris Hansen told a reporter that he felt no responsibility and "I sleep well at night." When he and executive producer David Corvo were asked whether Conradt's death would spur changes in how To Catch a Predator was made, they said it would not, because there was no evidence Conradt knew Dateline was even there; however, the NBC crew had arrived at Conradt's house before police, and were themselves reported to police by local residents for suspicious activity. In mid-2007, Hansen said he had no regrets about how the Murphy/Terrell operation was handled. In 2022, Hansen again defended himself, saying that the police were in charge of all aspects: they sought warrants on their own initiative, and they were the driving force behind confronting Conradt at his house.

NBC's own footage shows Dateline and police personnel working together such that the TV crew was even supplying Conradt's phone number and video surveillance. In 2007, Murphy's Chief Myrick stated that it had been a strictly police-led operation with no undue influence from NBC or PJ, and he disputed any Dateline involvement at Conradt's house. Myrick told 20/20 that he was proud of the sting.

Galen Ray Sumrow was a former police officer, the Rockwall County DA, and Conradt's boss. He reviewed the evidence and called the whole case botched: the defective search warrant would have precluded any evidence from Conradt's home, and a raid was dangerous and unnecessary when Conradt would have been in the DA's office on Monday. He blamed reality television and the Dateline travel schedule for the rush that led to Conradt's suicide. A Murphy police sergeant said the expedition was to prevent Conradt from contacting another minor, not NBC's impending departure.

District judge Mark Rusch signed the search warrant, and local municipal judge Cathy Haden signed the arrest warrant. Neither judge had been informed about Dateline's involvement, and both later testified that they would not have signed off had they known. Rusch blamed the Murphy police for how the situation ended.

Terrell, Texas, is in Kaufman County, whose district attorney called the Terrell Police "the most incompetent bunch of buffoons you've ever seen". He opined that Terrell's chief of police, Todd Miller, called SWAT because success in front of the nationally broadcast Dateline cameras was the department's last chance at proving "they really weren't a bunch of lummoxes." A friend of Conradt's and over-30-year veteran attorney in Kaufman County called the SWAT decision "the stupidest and most unnecessary thing that I have ever heard of in law enforcement."

In 2007, DA Roach explained to 20/20's Brian Ross that most of the operation was entirely "for show with no real law-enforcement purpose", that NBC and PJ muddied the legal waters regarding transcript-evidence and Miranda rights, and that the push for drama endangered both suspects and officers with unnecessarily aggressive take-downs.

=== By the news media ===
After Conradt's suicide, an article in the Columbia Journalism Review extensively investigated To Catch a Predator and the transparent Chinese wall between itself, Perverted-Justice, and law-enforcement. It called into question whether Dateline was reporting the news or creating it—both in Terrell and across all of its episodes.

A July 2007 article in Esquire reported on the operation, subheaded with "NBC's To Catch a Predator arrived in Murphy, Texas, to conduct a sting operation. The only honest thing that followed was the gunshot." Hansen denied much of the magazine's report, saying that To Catch a Predator wielded no influence over the police investigation, they did not trespass on Conradt's property, and that Perverted-Justice was not on-site in Terrell; only the last of these did the show's host concede, after conferring with his producer.

In September 2007, 20/20 reported on the Conradt case to illustrate the fraught possibilities when news media and police work too closely together: Murphy police received some of their instruction from Dateline personnel, dramatic footage superseded police procedure, and both NBC employees and Perverted-Justice volunteers were "deeply involved in the operation."
