= Optenet =

Optenet, Inc.
- Company type: Privately held company
- Industry: Computer and Internet security
- Founded: 1997; 29 years ago
- Founder: Francisco Martín Abreu, José Miguel Martín Abreu.
- Fate: Acquired by Israelian company Allot (>1000 employees) in 2015
- Headquarters: Madrid and San Sebastián, Spain and Miami, Florida, U.S., Miami, Florida, USA
- Number of locations: 5 commercial & support locations
- Area served: Europe, East Orient, South & North America
- Key people: Francisco Martín Abreu, CEO; Omar Aguirre (Mexicain), CCO; José Miguel Martín Abreu, RDO
- Products: Optenet Web Suite, COTTA, Wolf.
- Production output: 90,000,000 installations on man-of-the-street computers
- Services: Content security, web security, email security, malware protection, Security-as-a-Service (SaaS)
- Owner: Business Angels
- Number of employees: 150+
- Divisions: 2
- Website: www.optenet.com

Optenet was a global security company that provides customers with a multi-tenant Secure Web Gateway and with an antispam and antiphishing software. Primarily for carriers, managed security service providers and large enterprises. In March 2015, Allot acquired Optenet.

== History ==
Optenet was a private company that was a spin-off of the University of Navarra's Engineering Faculty and San Sebastián's Research Centre in San Sebastian, Spain. An internal study by a teacher in computer science, Francisco Martín Abreu, on antispam for the Spanish language proved that there was none efficient enough. Optenet was founded to fill this need. It provides customers with a multi-tenant secure web gateway and an e-mail infrastructure solution primarily for carriers, managed security service providers and large enterprises that want to create service offerings for their own clients. Its product Optenet WebSecure was recently awarded five stars in SC Magazine's Web Content Management Group Test, defining it as a 'Solid' Web Security solution.. In March 2015, Allot acquired Optenet for $38 million.

== Distinctions & achievements ==
Optenet has been named a "Cool Vendor" by Gartner for its innovative Multi-tenant technology in 2011, in Gartner's report, "Cool Vendors in Communications Service Provider Infrastructure 2011," authored by Akshay Sharma and Deborah Kish.
