= Creep Catchers =

Canadian child sexual abuse prevention group

- Formation: 2014
- Founders: Dawson Raymond
- Location: Several cities in Canada
- Official language: English

Creep Catchers is a network of Canadian vigilante groups founded by Canadian Dawson Raymond and Ryan Laforge.

== History ==
Dawson Raymond said he felt inspired to do the same in his city of Calgary, Alberta, naming his group "Creep Catchers." Raymond founded the group after being released from jail for a break-and-enter conviction.

An investigation by W5 reported that Creep Catchers have accused people of sexual crimes even when chatlog evidence showed no sexual content. The same organization stated that some members of Creep Catchers had criminal convictions, and one served time in federal prison. In 2016, a mentally ill woman who was herself a victim of child sexual abuse died by suicide after Creep Catchers accused her of child sex crimes.

Jonathan Woodward of CTV's W5 documented an investigation into Creep Catchers around the country, featuring Justin Payne, Creep Catchers founder Dawson Raymond, Ryan LaForge of Surrey Creep Catchers and Karl Young (aka Carl Murphy) of the Red Deer Creep Catchers. The documentary focused on the unseen side of Creep Catcher members and operations, including the criminal pasts of some members and questioning the possible financial gains of the various "chapters". The documentary also featured an interview with Edmonton Police Service ICE Detective Dave Dubnick, who tells the story of how a Creep Catchers group in Lloydminster, Alberta, interfered with an ongoing investigation of a child predator, leading to the man escaping surveillance and, months later, being arrested in Manitoba for molesting a toddler and a baby.

== Confrontations ==
In June 2016, two Penticton Creep Catchers, Mitch Shelswell and Tyler Fritsen, confronted a man who apparently intended to meet a 14-year-old girl. Shelswell told CTV News they had no plans to stop: "As long as we follow the rules given to us by Creep Catchers originally, we're doing everything legally."

On August 15, 2016, Surrey Creep Catchers confronted a Coast Mountain Bus Company employee with evidence that he tried to meet a 14-year-old boy at the Central City Shopping Centre. The man drove off, first striking a parked truck and almost hitting Ryan LaForge, who filmed the encounter. The Surrey RCMP closed its case without charges, and the man's employer began an internal investigation.

In August 2016, a University of British Columbia Student Housing and Hospitality employee, whom court records suggest was charged with four counts of luring a child under 14 in 2008, apologized profusely and tearfully when confronted by Surrey Creep Catchers about trying to meet a 15-year-old girl and sending her (actually LaForge) pictures of his penis.

On September 7, 2016, Surrey Creep Catchers caught an off-duty Surrey RCMP officer who allegedly tried to meet a 14-year-old girl at the Central City Shopping Centre. On September 16, the RCMP announced Constable Dario Devic was charged with communicating with a person under the age of 16 for the purposes of sexual interference or sexual touching, and breach of trust. He was released on bail with orders to avoid children or places children gather.

On October 21, 2016, Fraser Valley Creep Catchers released a video allegedly showing Windebank Elementary School Principal Jason Obert at a mall believing he would meet up with a 14-year-old girl for sex.

On April 3, 2017, Surrey Creep Catchers confronted a Langley official named Bob Andrews, trying to meet with a 13-year-old girl for sex.

== Responses ==
Some commentators, like John Gormley of Saskatoon's The StarPhoenix, opined that Creep Catchers, while meaning well, create danger for themselves and their suspects, jeopardize official investigations and undermine the rule of law. Other newspapers, like The Now, claim their chapters have public support and encourage police to work with them for their ability to weed out suspects.

In 2016, a social media commentator, Sean Smith, criticized the Creep Catchers movement. He was then called a pedophile by Ryan Laforge, of the Creep Catchers of Surrey, British Columbia. In March, 2017, Smith sued Laforge for defamation. It represented the second such lawsuit against Laforge.

Jason Proctor of CBC News reports that this trend of online pedophile hunters though not new, has been encouraged through success early on, and discouraged by "A chorus of police chiefs", citing an article by Chad Pawson of the CBC.

Jon Woodward of CTV's W5 documented his investigation of Creep Catchers, across Canada, looking into the unseen side of the organization. The 3-part episode aired February 18, 2017 and featured Justin Payne, Creep Catchers founder Dawson Raymond, Surrey Creep Catchers President Ryan LaForge and Red Deer Creep Catchers President Karl Young (aka Carl Murphy). The episode explored the criminal records of some Creep Catchers members, looked at the possible unreported revenue generation and interviewed an Edmonton Police Service member of the Integrated Child Exploitation ICE team, regarding the Lloydminster chapters' interference with one of their investigations.

== See also ==
- Child grooming
- Jewish Community Watch
- Dark Justice
- Perverted-Justice
- Sweetie
- Vigilantism
