= Internet Safety Act =

Proposed United States laws

- Other short titles: Internet Stopping Adults Facilitating the Exploitation of Today's Youth Act (SAFETY)
- Long title: To require a provider of an electronic communication service or remote computing service to retain for a period of at least two years all records or other information pertaining to the identity of a user of a dynamic IP address the service assigns to that user.
- Acronyms (colloquial): SAFETY Act
- Announced in: the 111th United States Congressth United States Congress

Legislative history
- Introduced in the House and Senate as; H.R. 1076; S. 436 by; Lamar Smith (R-TX); John Cornyn (R-TX) on; February 13, 2009 (House); February 13, 2009 (Senate); Committee consideration by; House Judiciary; Senate Judiciary

The Internet Safety Act and the Internet Stopping Adults Facilitating the Exploitation of Today's Youth Act (acronymized SAFETY) were two United States bills introduced in 2009 requiring "a provider of an electronic communication service or remote computing service [to] retain for a period of at least two years all records or other information pertaining to the identity of a user of a dynamic IP address the service assigns to that user."

Neither bill was passed by Congress.
