= Perverted-Justice =

Anti-child porn group in the US

- Founded: 2002
- Founder: Xavier Von Erck
- Defunct: 2019
- Location(s): California and Oregon
- Website: pjfi.org

Perverted Justice Foundation, Inc., more commonly known as Perverted-Justice (also known as PeeJ), was an American organization based in California and Oregon, which investigated, identified, and publicized the conduct of adults who have used chat rooms and other social media in order to solicit online sexual conversations and in-person meetings with minors. Their website serves as an archive of collected data on these investigations, which they make available in order to assist law enforcement and the public in understanding the behavior and child grooming techniques of online child predators.

The activity of the Perverted-Justice organization included online volunteers carrying out sting operations by posing as minors (the age range portrayed by the decoys was usually 10–15) on chat sites and waiting for adults to approach them. After obtaining the identifying information of the adults who are seeking sexual contact with minors (the adult seeking the minor may offer their telephone number or other details so that a meeting can be arranged), the organization would then pass the information on to law enforcement. Perverted-Justice's methods are sometimes controversial, and critics have labeled these actions harassment and possibly legal entrapment. The site additionally attracted media attention, both laudatory and critical, as a result of their collaboration with Dateline NBC on a series of televised sting operations called To Catch a Predator.

Perverted-Justice also operated a site that targets groups and individuals it identifies as being involved in the pedophile activism community, a site that provides information to abuse victims on their legal recourse, a site that gives advice to minors on dealing with grooming on the internet, and a site that targets organizations that Perverted-Justice believes allow pedophile activists to use their services. The foundation also offered free online training to law enforcement officers and had an intern program for college students.

In late 2018, Perverted-Justice announced that, from the beginning of 2019, they would be formally ending decoy operations, and effectively cease all other operations afterwards. They also announced that they would be converting the official website to an archive of past operations and collected data, and removing other site features such as the forums. The data they proposed to compile and make accessible on the website, including thousands of formerly unseen chat logs, is available for research purposes in order to assist anti-pedophile groups and law enforcement with regard to understanding the behavior and techniques of online pedophiles.

== Background ==
Perverted-Justice was set up in 2002 by Frank Fencepost and Xavier Von Erck (born Philip John Eide). The organization says that its online operations have led to 623 convictions as of October 8, 2018, with over 200 more currently awaiting trial, and an average of 25 arrests a month for the year of 2006. In 2006, the organization reported annual income of US$825,000 (equivalent to about $1,318,000 in 2025), with Von Erck earning a salary of $120,000 (equivalent to about $192,000 in 2025).

The site originally started with the posting of chat logs to shame people who engaged in sexual chats with purported children. Some members of the site allegedly went further by harassing the targets of their chats in real life, as well as their friends, neighbors, employers, and family. After a falling-out over a vitriolic chat log with a phone verifier in 2004, Fencepost was dismissed from the site. "Xavier became much more oriented toward getting pedophiles arrested rather than just making them complete social pariahs in their neighborhood," says Fencepost.

Von Erck said he got the idea for the website while watching people attempt to groom young girls in chat rooms in Oregon. He said Perverted-Justice was a computer watchdog agency that worked closely with law enforcement agencies. "The media likes to use the term 'vigilante' because it gets attention, but we don't consider ourselves vigilantes. We cultivate cooperation with police and work within the law to get justice, not outside of the law."

== Methods ==
Perverted-Justice functions by supporting volunteers who act as informants in chat rooms where minors can typically be found. The volunteers' public profiles have youthful-sounding usernames, young ages, and pictures of children. The administrators of the site say they do not initiate online contact with the users, and refuse to act on tips from the public as a result.

In the past, around this point, the chat log and details would be published on the site. Volunteers on the site's forums would then engage in "follow-up", attempting to identify and notify family members, employers, and neighbors. However, in December 2003, the organization set up its "Information First" program, in which interested police departments could contact Perverted-Justice, and any "busts" made within that department's jurisdiction would be sent straight to them without being posted to the website.

After facilitating their first conviction in July 2004, the site's operators switched to a policy of cold calling local police with the information they obtained.

Before Perverted-Justice's "Information First" program and cold-calling policy became standard, logs that received no interest from law enforcement agencies were posted directly to the website. In November 2006, after the site's 100th conviction, Perverted-Justice announced that chat logs would no longer be posted unless law enforcement was involved first, as "Information First" agreements were sufficient to cover most U.S. residents caught in a sting. The complete unedited chat logs, which usually contain sexually explicit content and obscenities (and sometimes are annotated with comments from the Perverted-Justice volunteer) are now posted to the website only after the person's legal case has been resolved. The current follow-up process consists of notifying a community of the offender's status once a person has been arrested and convicted.

To begin the follow-up process, the site's volunteers do a reverse-directory lookup to obtain their target's name, as well as check on the Web for any other information they can find about them. They then post the target's name, address, and photograph, if available, on the website, as well as the chat log: a record of the conversation they had with the volunteer. In a process called "Follow-up," additional volunteers on the site's forums, operating under rules and restrictions set up by Perverted-Justice administrators, will contact the target's family, friends, neighbors, and employer to alert them to the website posting.

All telephone numbers are removed from the site's main pages after two months (though still available on the site's forums), to avoid another case like that of the Milwaukee bank teller, who received a threatening phone call from a man who had obtained her number from the website. The woman had never been online or even owned a computer, and was forced to change her number, which had previously been registered to the subject of a Perverted-Justice sting.

== Media ==
Volunteers also took part in what the site's operators called "group media busts," where people were invited to a house by a self-proclaimed minor, who was actually a Perverted-Justice volunteer. When they arrived, they were greeted by a television news reporter. The first of these events was conducted in late 2003, in co-operation with investigative reporter John Mercure at Milwaukee's WTMJ-TV, whom the site credits with initially conceiving the concept. Similar events with other local news organizations took place in the following months.

In November 2004, the site teamed up with Dateline NBC in New York City to conduct a large sting operation, or "group media bust," entitled To Catch a Predator. Dateline rented a house and wired it with hidden cameras, while volunteers posed as minors in chat rooms, telling users who talked to them that they were home alone. "Within hours there were men literally lining up at our door," Dateline reported. In two-and-a-half days, 18 men showed up at the house after making a date with a Perverted-Justice volunteer.

After the third installment of To Catch a Predator, Perverted-Justice hired an agent and put the group's services out for bid to several television networks. NBC came out ahead and continued the highly rated series. Since then, the To Catch a Predator series of reports has grown into a widely recognized phenomenon, with busts all over the United States and numerous references and parodies in the media.

== Convictions ==
Perverted-Justice's website documents convictions that include disorderly conduct, indecently soliciting a child, attempting to entice a juvenile to travel with intent to engage in sexual act, transporting child pornography, and possession and dissemination of child pornography. According to the official website, Perverted Justice contributed to at least 623 convictions while stating that the actual number is likely closer to 650.

== Other activities ==
Perverted Justice formerly ran a website targeting individuals and groups involved in the online pedophile activist community. The site's stated objective was to "house our voluminous research regarding the identities and pursuits of those in the pedophile activist community". It listed a number of arrests of pedophile activists that it stated were based on its profiles.

They also built a list of "corporate sexual offenders", which they defined as "[a]ny company who is informed of pedophiles using their service to advocate the lifestyle of child/adult rape which then does not remove the pedophiles from their service", with corresponding lists of pedophiles who make use of the services.

Perverted-Justice volunteers also worked to match up MySpace profiles with convicted sex offenders from state registries and alert MySpace officials to their presence. They say they identified almost three thousand such profiles, most of which have been deleted.

== Reception ==
Perverted-Justice, as well as its volunteers, has been commended over the years by a number of individuals and organizations, including many active-duty law enforcement officials and child-safety advocates.

- The March 2007 issue of Law Enforcement Technology magazine covered Perverted-Justice.com and their operations with law enforcement. "We have 2,000 sworn officers, and there is no way we have the resources to do what Perverted Justice did for the NBC Dateline sting (where 51 offenders were arrested in three days)," says Lt. Chad Bianco of the Riverside County (California) Sheriff's Department. "They had 45 people working around the clock."
- Those praising the site include the host of America's Most Wanted, John Walsh. He has said: "Well, I think it's great. ... My hat is off to Chris Hansen, to NBC, to the people at Perverted-Justice for showing the American public repeatedly that the creep who preys upon our children could live next door. And he could be a rabbi, a school teacher or a priest or anybody. ... I think they've done a great job. Now that they've partnered with law enforcement and they're putting these guys away, I think they've provided a tremendous educational tool to the American public."
- Child-safety advocate Marc Klaas has come out publicly in support of Perverted-Justice and the work they do, suggesting that they go from city to city with their efforts. "I think if you were to take this 'Dateline' piece and turn it into a regular program, where Perverted-Justice and Chris Hansen or somebody else were to go from city to city to city on a weekly basis, you would create a real deterrent effect that would put some fear into the minds of these perverts."
- Child-safety advocate Ross Ellis, founder and executive director of Love Our Children USA, sent out a press release praising the efforts of Perverted-Justice, while sending a plaque to the organization. "We owe it to our children to keep them safe. The work that Chris Hansen, Dateline and Perverted Justice are doing should be a wake up call to every parent—because no child is immune from these predators. We are proud to present them with awards and express our gratitude for the courageous work they have done on behalf of children."
- Internet safety website ChildSeekNetwork set up a webpage praising Perverted-Justice. "The Child Seek Network has come under fire by a Texas Organization because of our link to the Perverted-Justice web site. It is our belief that children's safety is of the utmost importance. Peej works very hard to see that children are safe on the internet from online predators. Although some of their methods seem harsh or controversial, they get results and have aided the police in getting convictions on those who prey on minors. Every child has a right to be protected and feel safe; we will continue our efforts and applaud Peej for the work they do to assist in that goal."
- A letter was sent from the office of Senator Orrin Hatch (R-UT) to Perverted-Justice praising their efforts, especially in regard to getting the Adam Walsh Child Protection and Safety Act passed. "The Efforts of Perverted-Justice.com deserve a very special 'Thank you' from everyone interested in stopping the seduction and sexual attack on our children. NBC's Dateline has highlighted your efforts at catching sexual predators, using the internet to hunt the hunters. I believe these shows have directly impacted the timely passage of my bill. So I want to join Senate Majority Leader Bill Frist who acknowledged your efforts from the floor of the United States Senate the day the bill was passed. I want to say "Thank you" for your tireless efforts to stop sexual predators."
- Detective Mike Burns of the Darke County, Ohio Sheriff's Department commented on what Perverted-Justice brought to the table: "It was just a miracle from heaven as far as meeting our needs because we are just struggling so badly to get things going that here it is. Here’s the answers for you." Sgt. Chad Bianco of the Riverside County Sheriff's Department in California said, "We were approached by Perverted-Justice to do this large sting, and they told us that 'Dateline' would be following along. We jumped at the chance." Police Chief Hilton Daniels of the Fort Myers Police Department wanted his department to learn how to do an online internet predator sting: "We decided 'Well, let's get ahold of Perverted-Justice' and have them teach us how to do this operation."
- Officer Kevin Pineda of Flagler Beach, Florida was tasked by his department with researching Perverted-Justice prior to using their services. Although the department "was a little wary at first", Officer Pineda indicates that his research revealed "[nothing but] overwhelming joy from other departments that have actually utilized their services."
- The Laguna Beach Police Department gave Perverted-Justice administrators Del Harvey and Dennis Kerr an award for the sting they performed in their city.
- Speaking on the possibility of more sting operations, Lt. Matthew Stapleton of the Petaluma, California Police Department said: "[I]f we have the resources in the future, absolutely, we might do one. ... I don't think we would do a Dateline sting again, but we established a partnership with Perverted Justice, so they could help us, if necessary." He also commented, "Perverted Justice did everything, as promised. They were a perfect partner."

Perverted-Justice and its volunteers have been criticized over the years by several individuals and organizations. Individuals opposing Perverted Justice see it as an organization that encourages extrajudicial violence and harassment against individuals who have not yet been convicted of any crime in the legal system. Also, NBC journalist Stone Phillips from a Perverted Justice related event conceded that, "in many cases, the decoy is the first to bring up the subject of sex", leading to claims of illegal entrapment by the targets of Perverted Justices actions.

- One criticism of the site, made before Perverted-Justice began working primarily with law enforcement, was leveled by Tina Schwartz, National Center for Missing & Exploited Children (NCMEC) director of communications. She said: "It's really not the safest, most effective way to combat this problem. ... From what I've seen ... they embarrass the people, but I don't know that complete justice is ever served".
- Scott Morrow ran Corrupted-Justice.com, a now-defunct Canadian-based web site that was critical of Perverted-Justice. Morrow told ABC News in 2005 that, in his opinion, there is currently no way to hold Von Erck or any other administrators, operators, or volunteers at Perverted-Justice accountable for mistakes. "When you're running an organization or running a group of people with the potential to do as much damage to people's lives as this does, I think there also has to be some accountability." Morrow suggests many of Perverted-Justice's tactics are harassment "designed to destroy a person's life." He points out that even sex offender registries don't "list the names and background information of neighbors, employers and family members of the accused", as the Perverted-Justice website does. Perverted-Justice members are encouraged to spread information about their targets on internal forums and to contact their targets' families, employers, and neighbors.
- In an October 2007 preliminary hearing for the case of Maurice Wolin, Wolin's attorney Blair Berk argued that Perverted Justice's founder has a financial incentive to badger suspects. Von Erck testified in the hearing that he is paid an annual salary of $120,000 stemming from Perverted Justice's deal with NBC. Said Berk, "Xavier Von Erck had a problem. He had a television show to get on and a fancy cancer doctor to ensnare in his web, and he wouldn't let it go." The prosecutor in the case, Brian Staebell, stated, "The whole business of this preliminary hearing has been an attack on the Petaluma Police Department and Perverted Justice. But every time I go back to the chats and I look at how he was grooming this 13-year-old girl." After the hearing, Judge Raima Ballinger held Wolin over for trial, ruling that there was sufficient cause to believe Wolin committed the crime.
- Lee Tien, an attorney for the Electronic Frontier Foundation, is quoted as being concerned that the organization could send real predators into hiding. The site's operators respond that this is in fact their goal, to have real predators hide away from the places that children go; they liken the site to putting up a Community Watch sign at a local playground, which could be argued to discourage predators from kidnapping children there. Tien also argued that chat transcripts can be easily doctored. In order to bolster credibility, the organization claims it has implemented a number of safeguards to prevent this from happening, including routing all chats through an encrypted proxy server that mirrors the data. However, when pressed to provide the hardware he used to record evidence used in the Dr. Maurice Wolin case, Von Erck refused, claiming that the hard disk drive had "experienced a complete failure". As of December 2008, Perverted Justice has not produced any of the hardware it alleges to have used in gathering evidence in the Wolin case.
- Before Perverted-Justice began working primarily with law enforcement, child safety advocate Julie Posey described Perverted-Justice's tactics as "a gross invasion of privacy." Posey indicated that she did not feel the methods employed by Perverted-Justice were completely effective. "What it does is embarrass them for the moment... but then they'll go and get a different screen name and know to check things out a little more thoroughly next time." Posey and Perverted-Justice founder Xavier Von Erck appeared on Fox News Channel shortly thereafter, where Posey remarked, "It’s more of an entertainment site, actually. You go there, you click on a link of a picture that takes you to that person’s chat-log and that person has a scale—a sliminess scale as he calls it—and you can rate the pervert from, I think it’s, one to five. To me, that kind of gives a sense of entertainment. Anybody that finds entertainment value in exploiting children, I have a problem with it."
- Some law enforcement experts have also stated that, while they appreciate the site's mission, they do not agree with some of the operators' and volunteers' practices. In a December 2004 article in the New York Sun, Bradley Russ, the training director for the federal Internet Crimes Against Children Taskforce (which has trained about 200 law enforcement agents nationwide) said that the tactics of Perverted-Justice sometimes run counter to the task force's standards. For instance, Russ said, by accepting child pornography from their "busts" to bolster a potential legal case, the volunteers are themselves in possession of unlawful images. He said federal authorities have begun considering whether to seize Perverted-Justice contributors' computers. "It's a noble effort gone too far," Russ told the newspaper. He also said the site's tactics can make it more difficult for law enforcement to prosecute cases they present because those cases can be considered tainted by entrapment claims. According to Russ, "I have a real problem with any citizens' group conducting any investigation into any crime ... It's a mistake for law enforcement to abdicate its responsibility to citizens." Said Russ, "I think it's a huge mistake when law enforcement partners with citizens to do investigations. ... I'm very concerned about entrapment issues." Tom Nolan, a Boston University professor and former Boston police officer, echoes Russ's criticism, "I have an issue with private citizens engaging in these kinds of investigatory practices. ... Perverted Justice, even though they are in fact acting as agents of law enforcement, are not abiding by the policies. ... This is vigilantism. It's sensational vigilantism."
- Criminal defense attorney Angelyn Gates of Chase Criminal Defense Attorneys raises concern that citizen groups are not subject to the same standards as trained law enforcement officials. She notes that laws are designed to keep police officers from violating citizens' rights, and that the same rules don't apply to citizens who may be violating other citizens' rights. "Police officers are trained in theory," Gates said. "[Members of Perverted-Justice] are not watching out for themselves by trying to pretend they're a child on the Internet," she said. "They're doing it for the thrill, fun, and notoriety they seem to be getting out of it." Detective Mike Burns of Darke County asserts that Perverted-Justice sets stricter criteria than many law enforcement agencies do for arrest. He contends that Perverted-Justice subscribes to protocols well within those followed by law enforcement. He does however concede, "Sometimes it was a fine line, but they provided us with 140 people they were chatting with after 10 days with possibilities of showing up for a meeting. There's no way a department five times our size could have done that."
- The site has also been criticized for "disseminating its own brand of child pornography." Criminal defense attorney Peter D. Greenspun, who represented Rabbi David Kaye (a man convicted after a Perverted-Justice sting operation) argues that the content posted on Perverted-Justice.com could encourage child predators. "They are putting out for unfiltered, unrestricted public consumption the most graphic sexual material that they themselves say is of a perverted nature." The site's operators state that when they or their volunteers are sent child pornography, they "immediately report it to the police and without fail." Furthermore, they assure that every time this has happened, it has resulted in a conviction against the one sending the pornography, not against Perverted-Justice.
- In a Riverside County case, Judge Dallas Holmes commented on the merits of a Perverted-Justice-related case. Said Judge Holmes: "I don't like the smell of this case." Furthermore, he described the Perverted-Justice witness testifying in the case as "odd," "weird" and "repulsive". These comments were made after the jury deadlocked 10–2 in favor of acquittal in a case involving U.S. Marine William Lawrence Havey. Linda Dunn, a chief deputy district attorney in Riverside County, said she thought the outcome of the Havey trial had more to do with jurors' unwillingness to convict a Marine than with negative perceptions of the Perverted Justice witnesses.
- In May 2007, Perverted-Justice was criticized in a now-dismissed employment lawsuit brought by former Dateline producer Marsha Bartel. In the filing, Bartel alleges that NBC provides financial incentives to the group to use trickery and to humiliate targets to "enhance the comedic effect of the[ir] public exposure." According to Bartel, some of the men caught in the Predator sting operations have reported that the decoys begged them to come to the sting houses, even after they had decided to walk away. Perverted-Justice responded to the criticism by labeling Bartel a disgruntled former employee motivated by financial gain. The lawsuit was eventually dismissed after the New York Supreme Court ruled that "an employer is free to terminate an employee at any time for any reason or no reason."
- The father of a man arrested in a July 2006 sting by Perverted-Justice appeared before a Georgia Superior Court judge to seek an arrest warrant for Perverted-Justice founder Xavier Von Erck, stating that Von Erck solicited the commission of a felony from the man. The judge found that probable cause existed to believe Von Erck impersonated a girl and solicited the man with the intent for him to commit a felony, but declined to issue the warrant because when the act occurred, there was no actual girl and thus no crime occurred. The act of soliciting a felony is itself a felony. Attorney Gary Gerrard filed an appeal with the Georgia Court of Appeals, alleging that under Georgia law, solicitation is a felony whether or not a crime occurred. That appeal was ultimately rejected.
- In June 2007, Perverted-Justice was criticized following a sting operation in Collin County, Texas that resulted in the charges against 23 suspected online sex predators being dropped. Collin County Assistant District Attorney Greg Davis said the cases were dropped after Perverted-Justice failed to provide enough usable evidence. "In many cases, we could not prosecute because Perverted Justice refused to answer our questions, refused to participate as witnesses, or refused to turn over potential evidence." Susan Etheridge, director of the Children's Advocacy Center in Plano, Texas, was not surprised the cases were thrown out. She doubts the efficacy of a citizen-based group in conducting such a sting, "I know that law enforcement works very hard to find and prosecute Internet predators. When citizens do it—I don't know whether that can work. Perhaps policing is best left to the police." Responding to the criticism, members of Perverted-Justice have stated on their website that they were never asked for the relevant evidence, never refused to provide witnesses, and answered all the Murphy Prosecutor's questions. They describe the Collin County District Attorney's Office as "corrupt", "inept", and "incompetent", while labeling Collin County, Texas DA Greg Davis "the biggest liar we've ever dealt with in our lives."
- On January 10, 2008, a multi-count pro se (self-represented) civil lawsuit was filed in the District Court of Arizona by Jan Kruska seeking a change in current sex offender laws. Kruska is suing the group and a number of others, including Myspace and Go Daddy, claiming defamation, cyber-stalking and cyber-harassment after she was added to the now defunct Wikisposure site. Kruska's claims against Perverted-Justice were dismissed on August 9, 2010.

== Notable incidents ==
According to Von Erck, Bruce Raisley, a private pilot and software developer, made graphic violent threats against Perverted-Justice contributors and volunteers, and threatened to expose the online identities they used when posing as children. Raisley stated that he was a former Perverted-Justice member who left the group after he discovered that Perverted-Justice used a photograph of his son in a Perverted-Justice decoy profile, and failed to get a swift response from law enforcement. Allegations were made that Von Erck had "set out to destroy [Raisley] by posing as a woman, seducing him online with graphic sex chats, posting the transcripts on the web, and threatening to release a purported video of the individual masturbating." Raisley was lured to an airport waiting area, where he was secretly photographed by associates of Von Erck. The photos were later posted online along with a warning against further threats and attacks. In 2010, Raisley was convicted of orchestrating a DDoS attack against sites carrying the story. Raisley was sentenced to two years in prison and ordered to pay $90,383 in restitution for the attacks.

== Cessation of operations and final mission ==
In late 2018, the official site announced that they would end active decoy operations at the start of 2019. In addition to formally ending the chat room decoy operations that they were well known for, Perverted-Justice founder Xavier Von Erck announced that the organization would be suspending all active operations in 2019.

== See also ==
- Creep Catchers – Canadian child sexual abuse prevention group
- Internet vigilantism – Vigilante activities carried out through the Internet
- Suicide of Bill Conradt – 2006 death of American assistant district attorney
