= JiDion =

American YouTuber (born 2000)

- JiDion in 2022
- Born: Jidon Armani Adams; December 12, 2000 (age 25); Clear Lake City, Texas, U.S.
- Other name: DeMarcus Cousins III
- Education: Clear Lake High School
- Occupations: Influencer; online streamer; amateur civilian online predator catcher; Youtuber
- Agent: Proper Loud

Instagram information
- Pages: JiDion; edpwatch
- Years active: June 2020–present
- Followers: 3.297 million (combined) (Note: Subscribers, broken down by channel: 2.4 million (jidion_) 897 thousand (edpwatch))

Kick information
- Channel: JiDion
- Followers: 34.2 thousand

TikTok information
- Page: jidion
- Followers: 7.3 million

Twitch information
- Channel: jidionpremium
- Followers: 596 thousand

X information
- Handle: @edpwatch_
- Display name: JiDion
- Years active: March 2025–present
- Followers: 75.8 thousand

YouTube information
- Channels: JiDion JiDionPremium EDP Watch Jidion Shorts GiDeon1444
- Years active: 2018–present
- Genres: Comedy; vlog; Christian; predator catching
- Subscribers: 14 million (combined) (Note: Subscribers, broken down by channel: 8.51 million (JiDion) 5.48 million (JiDionPremium) 122 thousand (EDP Watch) 295 thousand (GiDeon1444) 114 thousand (Jidion Shorts))
- Views: 1 billion (combined) (Note: Views, broken down by channel: 256 million (JiDion) 691 million (JiDionPremium) 60.7 million (EDP Watch) 13.9 million (GiDeon1444) 2.11 million (Jidion Shorts))
- Last updated: November 15 2026
- Website: edpwatch.com/en-usd

Jidon Armani Adams (born December 12, 2000), known online as JiDion, is an American social media influencer. Adams initially focused his content on vlogging, pranking, livestreams and trolling. He has since shifted his content to focus on amateur civilian-led online predator sting operations under the name EDP Watch, named after YouTuber and alleged pedophile EDP445.

== Early and personal life ==
Jidon Armani Adams was born on December 12, 2000, in Clear Lake City, Texas, and attended Clear Lake High School. Adams has used the name DeMarcus Cousins III online, a reference to both his grandfather and basketball player DeMarcus Cousins. Beginning in 2023, he increasingly incorporated Christianity into his content. In April 2026, he announced his engagement to his long-time girlfriend.

== Career ==
Before becoming a full-time content creator, Adams worked at Lowe's and later as an Uber Eats delivery driver. Adams launched his YouTube channel on July 2, 2018, initially posting challenge videos and vlogs filmed while he was in high school. He also produced gaming videos featuring Call of Duty and Grand Theft Auto, followed by social commentary, reaction videos, and pranks. In September 2023 he announced that he intended to move away from prank content and removed his previous prank and non-Christian content, explaining in a video titled "Why I Deleted All My Videos...". He stated in 2022 that comedian Druski and creators KSI and Kai Cenat influenced his content.

=== Pranks and stunts ===
In January 2022, Adams was banned from Twitch after encouraging viewers to spam streamer Pokimane's livestream chat with "L + RATIO", Streamer Ninja got involved in the dispute which Pokimane criticized. In the aftermath, Adams was banned by Twitch and announced in April 2023 that he would stream on the alt-tech platform Rumble. He later apologized to Pokimane, and his account was reinstated in May 2024.

In March 2022, Adams crashed a Harvard University life sciences lecture taught by Andrew Berry and received a haircut during a Minnesota Timberwolves game against the Dallas Mavericks. In July, Adams was banned from Wimbledon for disrupting a quarterfinal match between Jannik Sinner and Novak Djokovic. Later that month TommyInnit accused him of harassing fans at TwitchCon. In September, Adams was removed from the men's final of the 2022 US Open after getting a haircut during the match. On June 21, 2022, Logan Paul announced that Adams was a member of Prime Squad. In August, Adams and Paul began a feud at a press conference for KSI vs Tommy Fury and, following the press conference, Adams and Paul had an altercation backstage. In 2024, Adams stated that one of his pranks involving Prime in which he pretends to be a Gatorade official to sneak into PepsiCo, resulted in three security guards being fired.

Adams and fellow YouTuber Damilola Onakoya, known online as Damii, disrupted a class at the University of Houston in February 2023. In March, arrest warrants were issued for Adams and Onakoya on misdemeanor trespassing charges. Adams acknowledged the warrant on April 10 and the following day posted a photograph of himself taunting the Houston Police Department by holding a sign reading "L + Ratio" outside their building. Adams was arrested on April 16 on the outstanding Harris County warrant. Later that month, Adams and Niko Omilana staged a stunt at the Louvre in Paris, France, where Adams placed a portrait of himself near the Mona Lisa and was arrested. In July, Adams received a lifetime ban from NBA and WNBA events after another stunt at a WNBA game in which he slept during the match.

In January 2024, Adams debated Christianity and Islam with fellow streamer Sneako during a livestream.

Adams was arrested in Woodhaven, Michigan on June 22, 2026, while livestreaming while confronting an alleged squatter connected to fellow YouTuber Skeeter Jean. Police stated that four individuals were arrested for breach of the peace and stalking, after officers responded to reports of a crowd gathering outside a local McDonald's. Adams told police, "I'm a multi-millionaire, I can take this as far as you want." Adams then made a response video where he said the incident brought out the worst in him and that he would be stepping away from livestream content. On July 13, the charges were dropped.

=== Online predator-catching activities ===
Adams was introduced to amateur predator-catching operations by Skeeter Jean and Alex Rosen, who had previously conducted citizen-led sting operations, inspired by media such as To Catch a Predator.

Adams began producing videos centered on amateur sting operations targeting the people that he believed were attempting to engage in sexual activity with minors. The name EDP Watch (also known as Expose Dat Predator), references the allegations surrounding YouTuber EDP445.

In his videos, Adams and his camera crew conduct investigations using adult decoys who pose as minors on dating apps and other online platforms. Adams said the group does not initiate conversations, engage in sexual discussions, or send explicit material. Instead allowing suspected individuals to initiate contact before preserving their communications and arranging an in-person meeting. After confronting the individual, the group contact local law enforcement and turn over collected evidence. Adams has claimed that the investigations have contributed to arrests and convictions in 30 U.S. states.

In June 2026, Adams announced that he had severed ties with Alex Rosen following controversy surrounding Rosen's reported contribution to the bond of Dalton Eatherly, known online as Chud the Builder.

==== Criticism ====
The content has drawn criticism from multiple law enforcement officials across several departments and states, whom have raised concerns about independent vigilante operations. Officials have warned that such groups cannot establish probable cause and that their operations can hinder investigations, and endanger participants and bystanders. During several confrontations, officers and prosecutors stated that they lacked sufficient probable cause to make an immediate arrest. One law enforcement agency said, "Police aren't contacted until an individual has been identified, lured to, and is physically at a known location."

In a discussion with Howie Mandel, Chris Hansen expressed that most online predator-catching creators can place greater emphasis on public humiliation and physical confrontation.

==== Collaboration with Schlep and Ruben Sim ====
Following similar videos by YouTuber Schlep, who also conducted independent amateur civilian-led sting operations involving child safety on Roblox. Adams and Ruben Sim began collaborating with Schlep and appeared in his videos. Schlep also uses decoy accounts to identify individuals allegedly seeking to exploit minors. According to Schlep's legal representation, evidence from the operations was forwarded to local law enforcement, resulting in six arrests. Separately at CrimeCon 2025, Chris Hansen and Schlep spoke about the child safety on Roblox.

==== EDP445 ====
Bryant Moreland in Mike Clum's documentary in 2026.

Former YouTuber Bryant Turhan Emmerson Moreland, known online as EDP445 (standing for "Eat Dat Pussy" and a reference to his weight), began his YouTube channel in 2010 and gained attention for videos about his Philadelphia Eagles fandom and his profanity-filled reactions to their games. On April 18, 2021, YouTubers Alex Rosen and CC Unit conducted an amateur sting operation against Moreland, with Rosen communicating and setting up a meeting with Moreland through a decoy account representing a 13-year-old girl. Moreland would say that he was at the location to pick up a cupcake. The Kern County Sheriff's Office investigated the incident, but it did not result in criminal charges or arrest. Following the confrontation, Moreland deleted videos from his YouTube channel, and YouTube terminated his channels later in 2021.

In October 2023, EDP445 was confronted during an amateur sting operation by Adams and Skeeter Jean, alleging that EDP445 had been communicating with an actual minor.

They went through piece by piece and he figured it was the police and if he just said the truth that he would be able to get away. He admitted to everything.

— Mike Clum

Mike Clum released a documentary The Sick Mind of EDP445 in 2026, where Chris Hansen criticized online operations and their methods as a way for prioritizing online content and entertainment over investigative procedures, describing some as "amateurish and sloppy". Regarding the first investigation, Hansen said that Predator Poachers had "botched the investigation by messaging EDP first", which he said made the case "un-prosecutable". Hansen also criticized the second investigation conducted by Adams and Skeeter Jean as a "clown show". Skeeter Jean acknowledged that the outcome might have been different had he and Adams not engaged with Moreland, but questioned where the resulting content would have come from.

On November 4, 2026, JiDion confirmed with a YouTube video EDP445 had been arrested outside of Henderson, Nevada by the Las Vegas Metropolitan Police Department for multiple felonies including attempting to meet an underaged minor for sex in Bakersfield, California in 2021. It is also confirmed in a statement he will be transferred over to Kern County, California by the Kern County District Attorney’s Office at this time.

Following the arrest of Moreland, Jidion announced the end of his predator catcher show "EDP Watch", and that there will no longer be any new episodes filmed or released. Jidion also announced edpwatch.com is now officially free-to-air and that people who paid for the website's subscription for the month of November had their payments donated to charity which included the Rape, Abuse & Incest National Network and Nita Marie's Angels.

==== Hullo ====
External videos
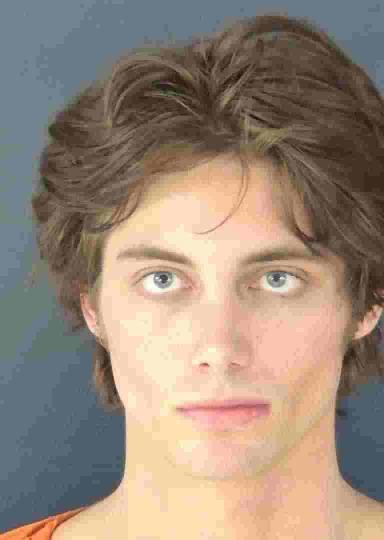
- Mugshot of Mason Isaac Hull (May 6, 2026) Adams and Alex Rosen would publish a video confronting Hull.
- I Caught A Famous TikToker Buying Cp! (Hullo)

In May 2026, 18-year-old looksmaxxing social media personality Mason Isaac Hull, known online as Hullo, was publicly accused of possessing child pornography. Following an investigation by the Sarasota County Sheriff's Office (SCSO) and the Internet Crimes Against Children (ICAC) Unit, Hull was arrested on May 6 after detectives obtained a warrant and charged him with 15 counts of possession of CSAM. A search of his mobile phone uncovered images and videos depicting female children between the ages of 8 and 15. Adams would call Hull a "danger to society". Adams also stated while on a live stream, that he had provided testimony during Hull's bond hearing.

== Awards and nominations ==
Year	Ceremony	Category	Result	Ref.
2022	12th Streamy Awards	Creator of the Year	Nominated	
2023	13th Streamy Awards	Creator of the Year	Nominated	
2024	Harrison, Arkansas Ambassador of Peace	Civil Service	Won	

== Filmography ==
=== Web ===
Year	Title	Role	Notes
2023	Sidemen Charity Match	Himself	At London Stadium.
2024	MrBeast	Himself	Episode: "50 YouTubers Fight for $1,000,000"
2026	The Sick Mind of EDP445	Himself	Documentary

== See also ==
- Anti-pedophile activism – Form of activism
- Child Exploitation and Online Protection Command – Command of the National Crime Agency
- Dads Against Predators – American vigilante group
- ECPAT – Children's rights organisation
- Hebephilia – Sexual preference for pubescent children
- Jailbait – Slang term used for a young person
- Legality of child pornography
- Perverted-Justice – Anti-child porn group in the US
- Protect (political organization) – Organization for the protection of children
- Stinson Hunter – British vigilante
- Trilogy Media – American YouTubers and scambaiters
- WeProtect – Nonprofit global organization
