= Ron Klein (disambiguation) =

Ron (or Ronald) Klein (or Klain, Kline, Clyne) may refer to:

- Ron Klain (born 1961), White House Chief of Staff from 2021 to 2023
- Ron Klein (born 1957), American lawyer and former Florida politician
- Ron Kline (1932–2002), American baseball player
- Ronald Kline (born 1941), American judge investigated by Bradley Willman
- Ronald Clyne (1925–2006), Canadian graphic designer
