= 2026 Plovdiv murder =

Crime in Plovdiv, Bulgaria

2026 Youth Hill murder
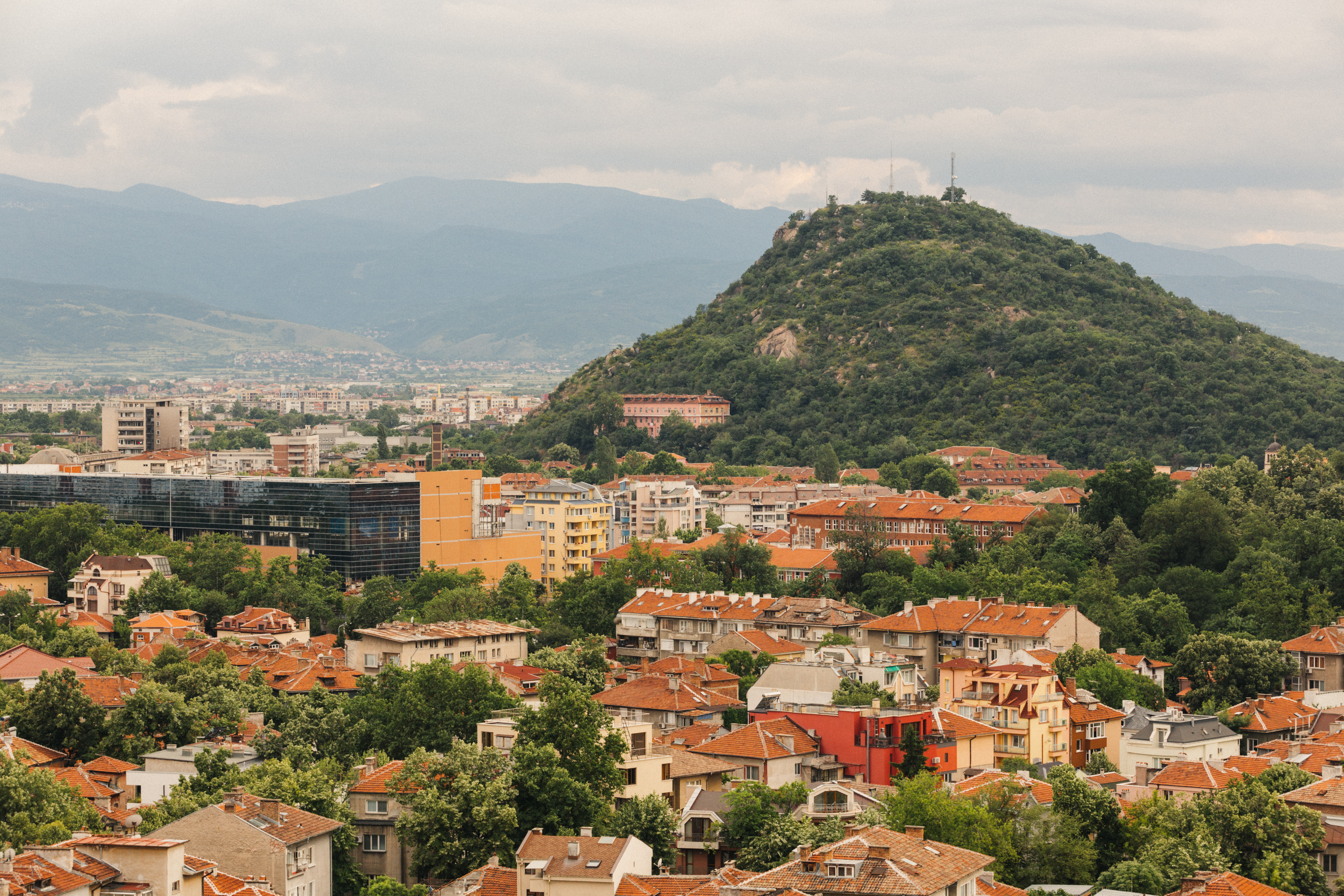
- View of Dzhendem hill in Plovdiv
- Location: Dzhendem tepe (Mladezhki hill), Plovdiv, Bulgaria
- Date: 4 August 2026 c. 17:00–17:20 (EEST)
- Attack type: Luring, beatdown, robbery, homicide
- Weapon: Physical force
- Deaths: 1
- Victim: Georgi Kuzev (aged 37)
- Perpetrators: 5 teenagers charged with murder; up to 5 additional minors detained
- Motive: Vigilantism, hooliganism, robbery

The 2026 Plovdiv murder occurred on 4 August 2026 on Dzhendem tepe (Bulgarian: Младежки хълм, Youth Hill) in Plovdiv, Bulgaria. Georgi Kuzev, a 37-year-old resident of Krichim, was lured to a park area by a group of teenagers using a social media dating application. Kuzev was ambushed, subjected to an extended physical assault and torture lasting over an hour, and robbed. He succumbed to his injuries in a hospital later that evening.

Ten teenagers aged between 14 and 17 were initially detained in connection with the attack. On 7 August 2026, the Plovdiv District Court ordered five minors—three boys and two girls—to remain in permanent pre-trial custody on charges of premeditated murder committed with exceptional cruelty and hooligan motives.

== Background ==
=== Victim ===
The victim, Georgi Kuzev, was a 37-year-old worker from Krichim. Relatives and municipal officials described Kuzev as a quiet, trusting individual who lived alone following the deaths of his parents. Relatives stated that Kuzev was using online social networks to seek a romantic relationship.

=== Luring scheme ===
According to the Plovdiv District Prosecutor's Office, the perpetrators created fake social media accounts to arrange meetings under false pretenses. A 17-year-old female member of the group posed online as a 15-year-old girl (catfishing) to set up a meeting with Kuzev at Youth Hill (Dzhendem tepe). Prosecutors noted that Kuzev did not conceal his identity or age during their exchanges. Supervising prosecutor Anelia Trifonova stated that the group claimed to emulate online "pedophile hunter" vigilantism groups, though law enforcement emphasized that the youths' true objective was to launch a physical assault rather than contact law enforcement.

== Incident ==
On 4 August 2026, Kuzev arrived at Youth Hill in central Plovdiv to meet the individual with whom he had communicated. Upon his arrival, a group of up to ten teenagers surrounded him and forced him into a wooded area of the park.

For over an hour, the group subjected Kuzev to continuous physical abuse. According to court statements by Judge Petko Minev and prosecutors, the attackers repeatedly beat, kicked, and strangled Kuzev. During the assault, members of the group shaved his eyebrows, extinguished cigarette butts on his skin, drew swastikas on his body, and spat on him. Several accomplices filmed the assault using mobile phones and broadcast the footage live on social media platforms.

Following the beating, the perpetrators stole approximately 30 euros from Kuzev. The teenagers subsequently used the stolen money to purchase doner kebabs.

Kuzev managed to move to the foot of the hill after the attackers fled. At approximately 5:20 p.m. EEST, passersby discovered him lying helpless with visible signs of severe trauma and alerted emergency services via 112. Medical personnel transported him to a local hospital, where doctors diagnosed him with severe traumatic brain injury, multiple fractures, and internal organ lacerations, including ruptures to his lungs, liver, and kidneys. Kuzev died from his injuries later that evening.

== Legal proceedings ==
Following an investigation by the Second Regional Department of the Ministry of Internal Affairs in Plovdiv, police detained ten minors aged 14 to 17.

The Plovdiv District Prosecutor's Office filed formal murder charges against five of the detained minors—three boys and two girls. The charges specified premeditated homicide committed with exceptional cruelty and hooligan motives.

On 7 August 2026, the Plovdiv District Court held a closed-door detention hearing. The court ordered all five primary defendants remanded in permanent pre-trial custody, ruling that the evidence indicated deliberate intent and extreme brutality without provocation from the victim. Under the Bulgarian Penal Code, juvenile offenders face statutory sentence reductions, carrying potential prison terms of 3 to 10 years for minors under 16, and 5 to 12 years for those aged 16 to 17.

== Reaction ==
The killing happened after a number of other high-profile anti-gay attacks by youth gangs in the country, which had taken place in 2020 and 2023, after which crimes based on sexual orientation were classified as hate crimes under the Bulgarian Criminal Code. Bulgarian LGBT group GLAS demanded a "impartial investigation" into the incident, and stated that law-enforcement was investigating "whether the crime was motivated by hatred related to the victim’s sexual orientation".

The mayor of Krichim Municipality, Atanas Kalchev, issued an official statement extending condolences to Kuzev's family and demanding full legal accountability for the perpetrators. On 6 August 2026, residents of Krichim gathered for a vigil outside Kuzev's home, rejecting the alleged vigilantism claims and demanding maximum legal penalties.

Deputy Prime Minister Ivo Hristov publicly commented on the case, criticizing attempts to minimize juvenile responsibility in violent offenses. Human rights organizations, including the Bulgarian Helsinki Committee, issued statements urging thorough judicial review of bias motives and youth violence prevention measures.

Prime minister Rumen Radev described the incident as "extremely serious and is characterized by a high degree of public danger due to the cruelty of the crime committed". He stated that the country's legislative branch was in the process of considering a bill to tackle youth violence.
