= Wojnowski =

Wojnowski (feminine: Wojnowska; plural: Wojnowscy) is a Polish surname. It may refer to:

- Bob Wojnowski, American reporter and columnist
- Jan Wojnowski (1946–1990), Polish weightlifter
- John Wojnowski (born 1943), American anti-pedophile activist
