= Mike Clum =

American filmmaker (born 1992 or 1993)

- Undated photo of Clum
- Born: 1992 or 1993 (age 33–34); Cleveland, Ohio, U.S.
- Occupations: Producer, director
- Years active: 2011–present
- Notable work: The Dark, Sad Life of Boogie2988; The Sick Mind of EDP445
- Website: https://clumcreative.com/

Michael Clum (born 1992 or 1993) is an American producer and director. He founded the video production company Clum Creative in 2011. He is known for his YouTube documentaries The Dark, Sad Life of Boogie2988 (2023) and The Sick Mind of EDP445 (2026).

== Early life and Clum Creative ==
In 2011, Clum dropped out of Miami University, purchased a camera, and started to sell music video services, cold-calling business and musicians, which eventually grew into Clum Creative, which focuses on commercial video production, documentaries, animation, and branded content.

== Notable work ==
In October 2023, Clum created a YouTube account and uploaded his first documentary, The Dark, Sad Life of Boogie2988. It follows YouTuber Boogie2988 and documents his decline in popularity, financial issues, and his health problems. The reception of the documentary was positive, with many praising its high quality production.

In August 2026, Clum released his second film, The Sick Mind of EDP445. The documentary featured Bryant Moreland, better known as EDP445, who had his YouTube channel terminated after being caught in two sting operations in which Moreland attempted to meet underage girls for illicit purposes after sending them explicit messages. It explores Moreland's childhood, and the reason why Moreland wasn't prosecuted by authorities. Containing interviews with the sting operators, JiDion, Skeeter Jean, and Alex Rosen, along with interviews with Chris Hansen and other YouTube personalities, the documentary gained a generally positive to mixed reception. Mike stated that the revenue from the documentary would go to the nonprofit Rape, Abuse & Incest National Network. In November 2026, Moreland was arrested and charged with four felonies, with the Kern County District Attorney’s office stating they had reopened the case "in light of recent statements made by Moreland in the documentary".

== Filmography ==
=== Web ===
Year	Title	Role	Notes
2023	The Dark, Sad Life of Boogie2988	Producer	Documentary
2026	The Sick Mind of EDP445	Producer	Documentary
