= North West Hebephile Hunters =

Child sexual abuse prevention group in Northern England

North West hebephile Hunters
- Abbreviation: NWHHG
- Formation: 2015
- Founders: Unknown
- Purpose: Prevention of adult-minor sex
- Location: Northern England
- Methods: Public exposure of adults who attempt to meet minors for sex
- Official language: English

North West Hebephile Hunters are a group based in the north of England who attempt to prevent child grooming or child sexual abuse by confronting those they suspect of doing so. Their main method is luring adults they have previously communicated with online whilst posing as minors. In the aftermath they make a live broadcast of their interaction with alleged culprits whilst airing transcripts of previous sexually explicit communications and / or involve law enforcement.

The organisation consists of "decoys" who do the luring by posing as children, "hunters" who do the confronting, and a commentator who highlights the dangers of the combination of social media and youth. They also enact citizen's arrests. The group also provides evidence of infractions to the police, and they claim that their actions have resulted in the arrest of 300 suspects. The group consists of unpaid volunteers and has been described as an "online child protection group". The group's name is sometimes abbreviated as NWHHG, meaning North West Hebephile Hunting Group. The group coordinates with similar activists. NWHHG has also been described as a vigilante group which engages in "stings".

== See also ==
- Dark Justice
