= Anti-pedophile activism =

Form of activism

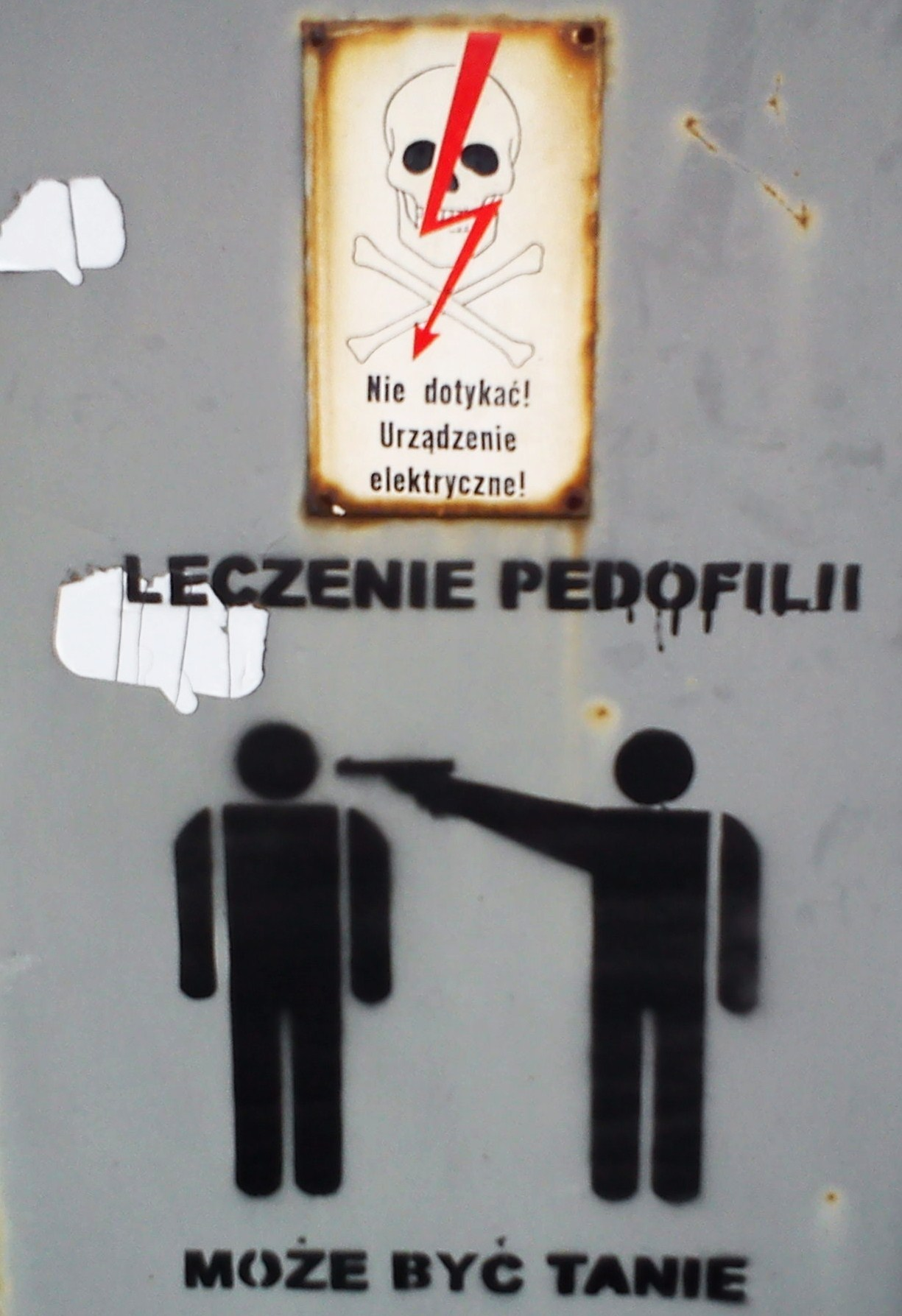
Graffiti in Poland. The accompanying text translates to: "Treatment of pedophilia can be cheap."

Anti-pedophile activism encompasses social actions against pedophiles. It also includes acts of anti-pedophile citizen vigilantism conducted by vigilante groups, some of which have operated alongside government agencies in countries such as the United States, Canada and the United Kingdom.

Activities performed by anti-pedophile vigilante groups have included harassment, including against families of people accused of crimes as well as people wrongly accused, doxing, blackmailing and physical attacks, with some people being killed or having died by suicide after being accused, for which reasons such groups have been widely condemned by law-enforcement and government bodies.

In the 2010s, several vigilante groups were established in countries including the United States and United Kingdom, many of which were inspired by To Catch a Predator, an American reality television show that had worked alongside vigilante group Perverted-Justice until being cancelled following the suicide of American assistant district attorney Bill Conradt in 2006.

In Russia, neo-Nazi activist Maxim Martsinkevich launched the Occupy Pedophilia project in 2012, which targeted men that sought sexual activities with boys on the internet, who would be subject to several sorts of torture and humiliation on camera. In the United Kingdom, the tabloid newspaper News of the World launched anti-pedophile campaign Name and Shame in 2000 that aimed to expose people convicted of sex offenses. The campaign resulted in several lynch-mob and firebomb attacks occurring in England and Scotland, most of which targeted innocent people who were wrongly identified as child sex offenders.

== Background ==
=== 19th century ===
The contemporary societal attitudes regarding pedophilia are rooted in the belief that childhood is a stage of human development marked by the traits of innocence and vulnerability, as well as in the idea that pedophilia constitutes a form of "perversion". Both of those concepts were conceived in the 19th century, with the second being developed by the field of psychiatry at a time when it was seeking to medicalize human sexuality and develop psychiatric interventions into the legal apparatus. In this paradigm, pedophiles have been regarded as "a-priori criminals", with their inherent traits themselves instead of their actions being designated as dangerous.

=== 1970s–2000s ===
Pedophilia was not seen as a widespread societal issue before the 1970s and the term was, until then, mostly confined to academic discussions, although male "pederasts" had sometimes been a focus of public anxiety. In one early case, Ewan MacColl mentioned in his autobiography a time in the 1920s when an armed mob of women in Salford responded to a string of sexual attacks with a vigilante attack on a man who was later found to have been elsewhere at the time.

During the 1970s, the topic of child sexual abuse began to be expanded by feminist thinkers, and media coverage of pedophilia began to increase amid societal concerns regarding child pornography and homosexuality.

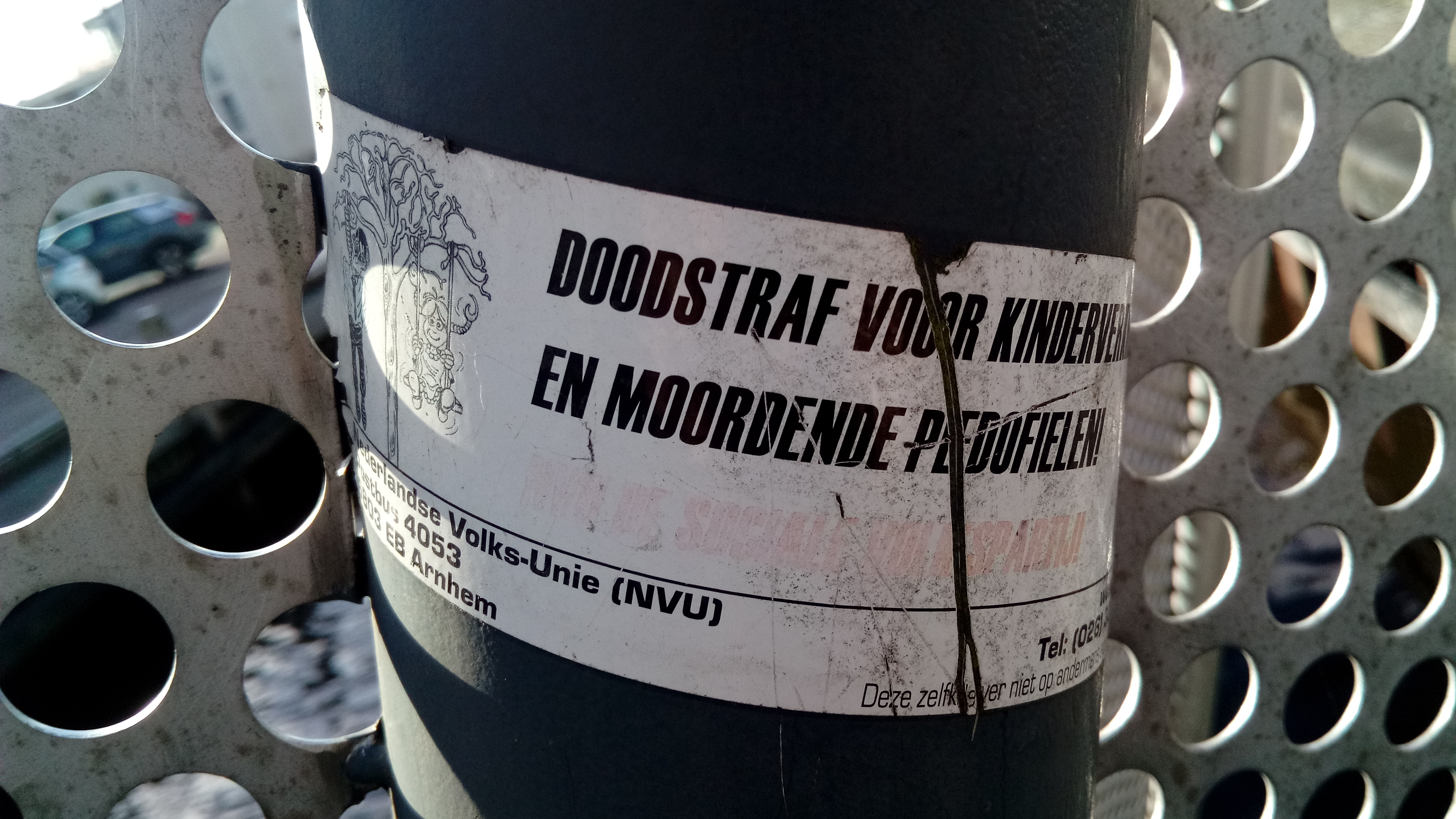
A NVU sticker in the Netherlands asking for the death penalty for "child rapists and murderous pedophiles" (2020)

Throughout the 1970s, public attitudes regarding child sexual abuse began to shift, with principles of risk-management and retribution against offenders taking precedence over rehabilitation. This shift was also observed in the field of penology more broadly. Starting in the 1980s, pedophiles began being portrayed by the media as more violent, with links to sexual abuse networks, sexual assault and murders being made by popular media.

In the late 1980s and throughout the 1990s, pedophiles began being described by broadsheet and tabloid media as inhuman monsters and beasts, with calls for increased government surveillance being made. The use of the term "predator", which had no meaning in law or sexology before the 1990s, was also popularized at that time as a way to refer to people who commit child sex crimes in a way that compares their behaviors and traits to those of animals.

Criminology researcher Amy Adler stated in 2001 that public concern regarding child sexual abuse was "a modern phenomenon that has grown significantly over the last two decades". In Moral Panic: Changing Concepts of the Child Molester in Modern America, professor Philip Jenkins has described such concerns as cyclical and fluctuating widely throughout the 20th century in accordance with the changing roles of interest groups such as feminists, psychiatrists, politicians and child protection groups. Some researchers, including Jenkins, have described modern concerns regarding pedophilia as a moral panic under Stanley Cohen's definition of the concept.

=== 2000s–present ===
With the popularization of the Internet, several anti-pedophile vigilante groups emerged seeking to combat child sex crimes. Such groups have used technology tools to engage in campaigns of public shaming and doxing with the goal producing effects including deterrence, punishment and systematic change. Actions of citizen vigilantism has resulted in loss of life of some individuals accused of sexual crimes, as well as humiliation and psychological trauma experienced by family members.

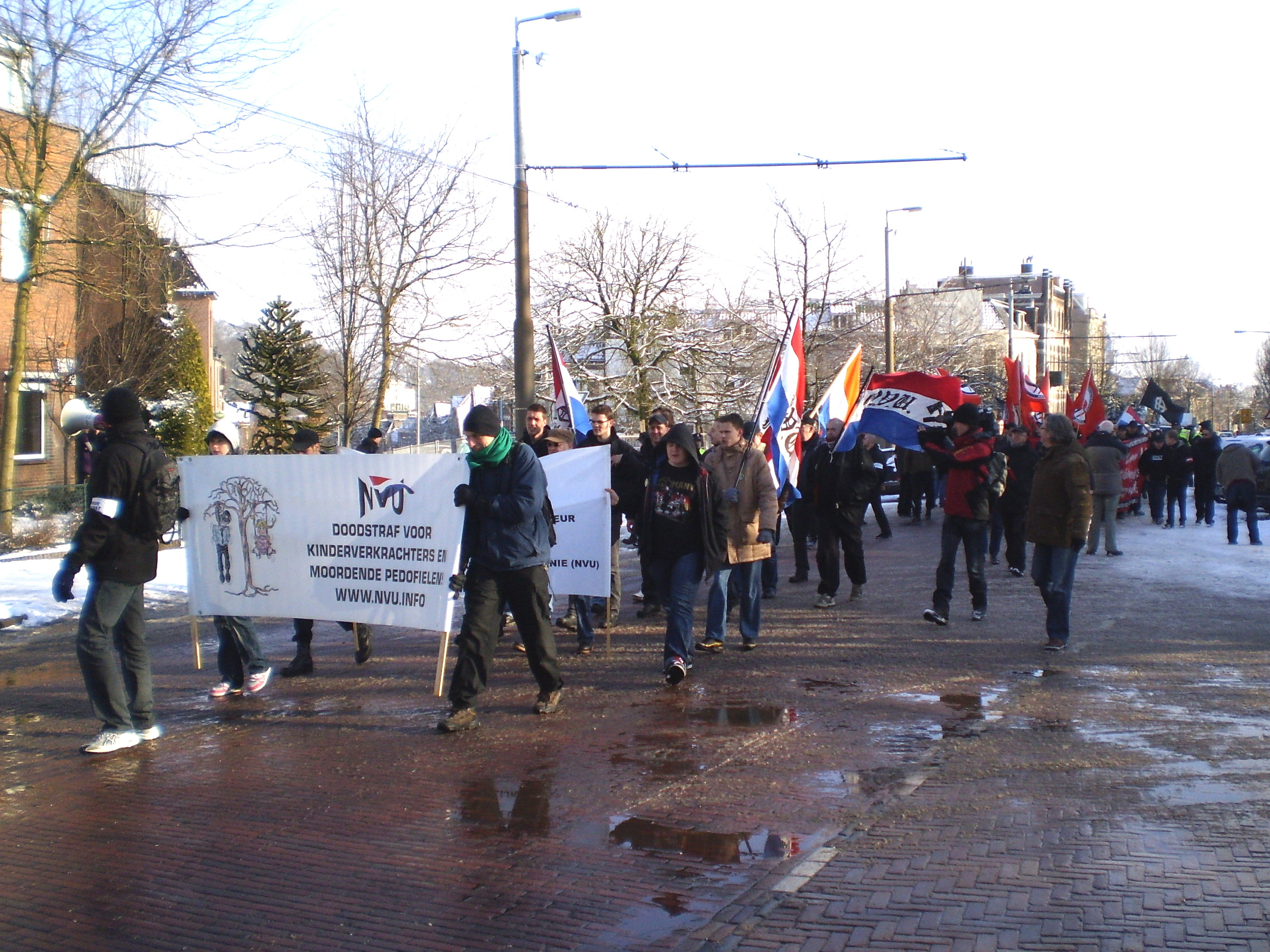
A 2010 NVU demonstration in Arnhem, propagating the "death penalty for child rapists and murderous pedophiles"

Vigilantism against pedophiles has been generally positively received among the general public, but widely condemned by law-enforcement workers. Pedophilia is one of the most rejected mental conditions. A German poll found that 14% of its participants believed that people with pedophilia should better be dead even if they had not committed any sort of crime; another English-speaking poll found that 27% of participants agreed on the same idea.

Although news outlets have routinely described child sex offenders as "pedophiles", pedophilia is a different concept from child sexual abuse. Jenkins described the concept of "the pedophile" as an elastic social construction that has been represented in varied ways in different times, according to commonly accepted professional wisdom and ideas circulated by the media and popular culture. Academic Terry Thomas wrote that "the 'paedophile'", emerging as "the hate figure of our time", occupies the heart of "secular demonology".

== History ==
=== In the United States ===
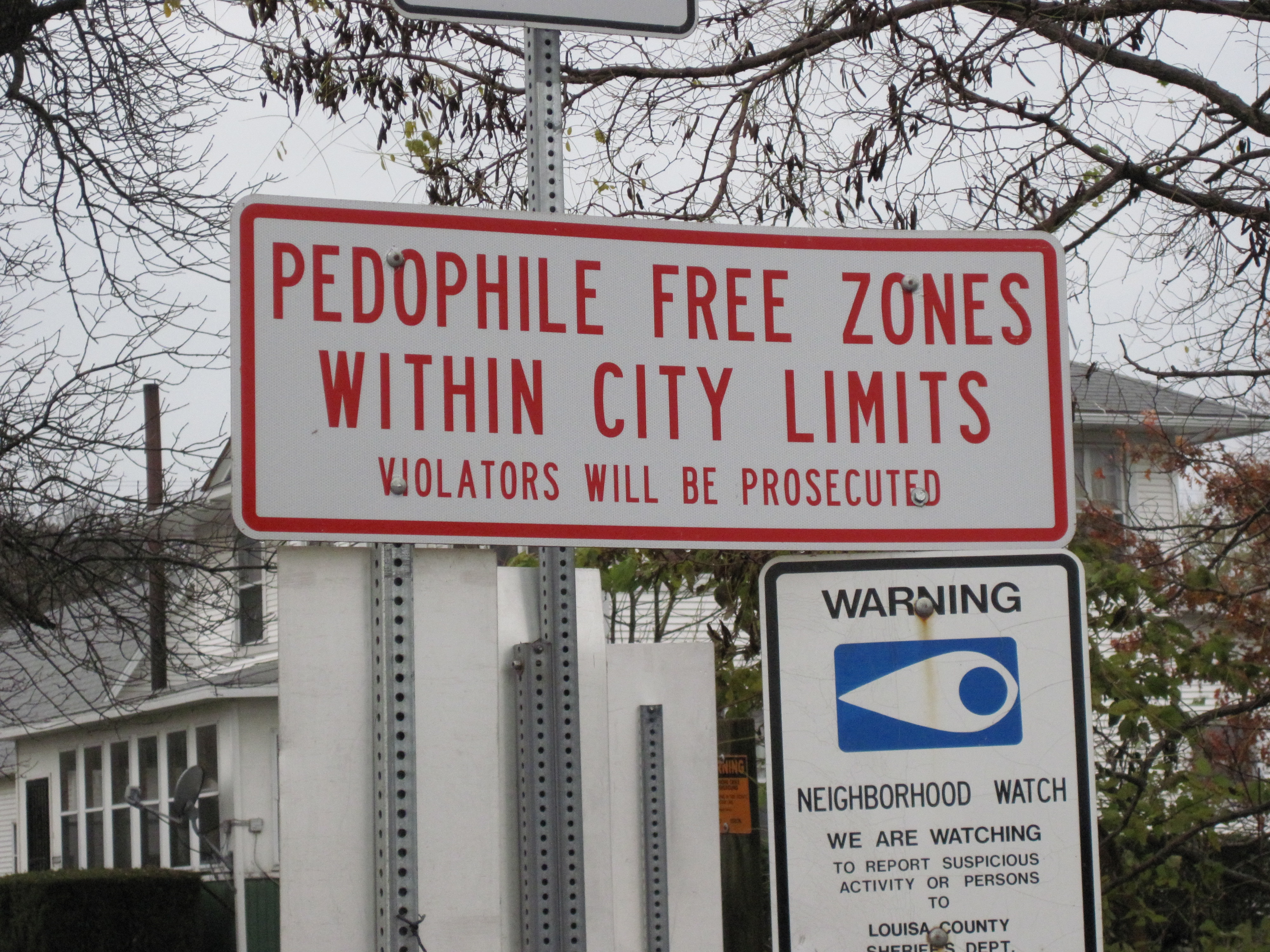
Anti-pedophile sign put after the enactment of Megan's law in Iowa

First established in the 1990s in most of the United States, American sex offender registration and notification laws have been directly attributed to acts of vigilantism against alleged pedophiles and registrants, including harassment and life-threatening attacks.

In 1993, a mob in Snohomish County, Washington, burned down the home of a sex offender after the local sheriff distributed leaflets with the message which described him as having "sadistic and deviant sexual fantasies which include torture, sexual assault, human sacrifice, bondage and the murder of young children". In September 1999, a mentally disabled Vietnamese refugee was beaten by a group of four vigilantes, who mistook him for a pedophile on the registry, after he was seen playing with neighborhood children. Hundreds of other instances of vigilantism caused by notification laws have been reported, including instances of misidentified individuals being attacked by vigilantes.

==== To Catch a Predator ====
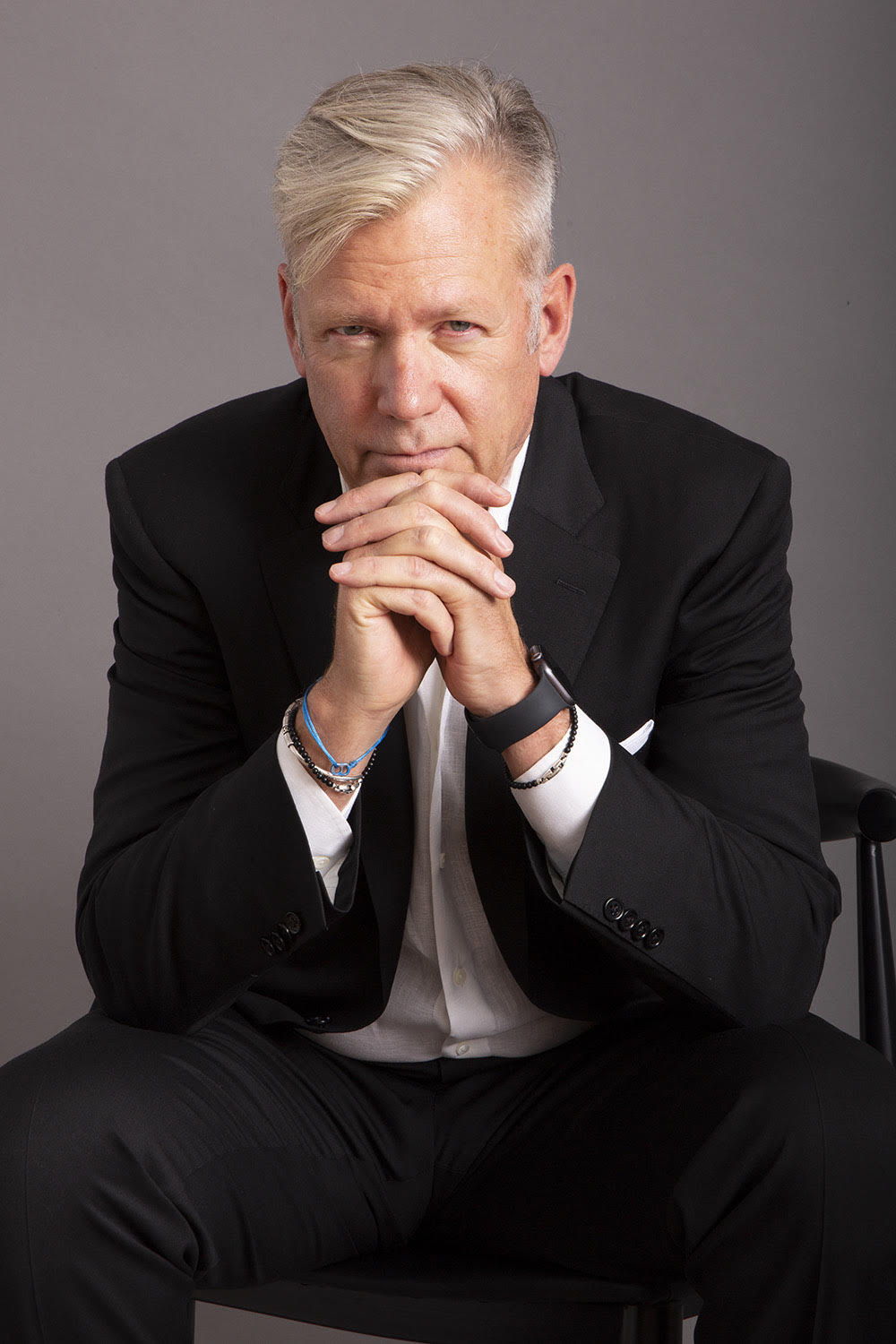
Hansen in 2021

In 2004, reality television series To Catch a Predator was launched on Dateline NBC. The show featured sting operations, set up in collaboration with vigilante group Perverted Justice and law-enforcement agencies, in which men who sought sexual relationships with minors on the internet would be lured into a house filled with hidden cameras, where they would be asked humiliating questions by the program's host Chris Hansen before being arrested by police officers.

Florida State University history professor Paul Renfro stated that To Catch a Predator "shaped how people think about sexual violence in ways that we haven’t fully grappled with", depicting strangers as a threat, while in reality most cases of child sexual abuse involved a person known to the child. The show fueled the passage of the 2006 Adam Walsh Act, which made sex offender registries publicly searchable. There is little evidence that such registries are effective in deterring crime.

Hansen described To Catch a Predator as a form of parallel journalism. Marsha Bartel, a former producer for Dateline, stated in a 2007 lawsuit that the organization "pays or otherwise reimburses law enforcement officials, trades its video services for information and for dramatically staged arrests, and illegally provides video feeds to prosecutors". The Poynter Institute criticized the show for lacking ethical journalism, stating that "it's no longer a parallel investigation when the cops are basing their decisions to call in the SWAT team on the observations of the journalists".

===== Suicide of Bill Conradt and lawsuit =====
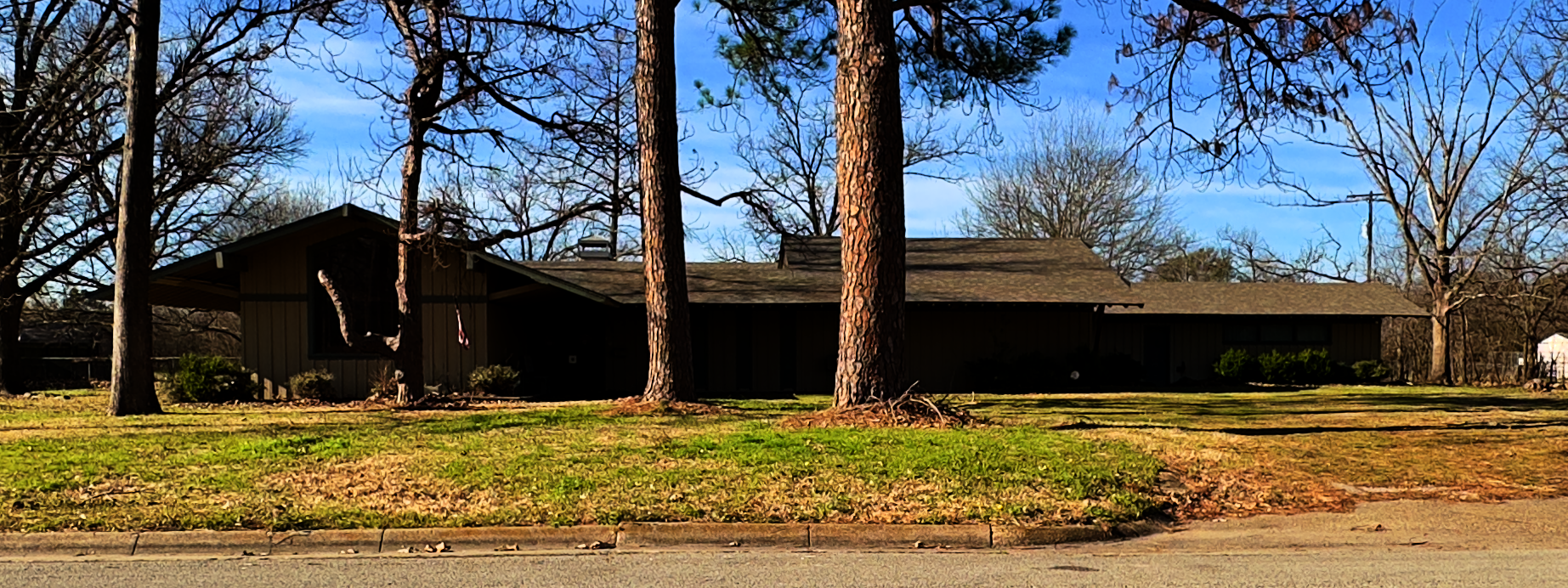
House where Conradt's suicide took place (pictured in 2023)

In 2006, Bill Conradt, an assistant district attorney living in Dallas, Texas, was accused of having interacted with a person he believed to be an underage boy, including telephone contact and sending explicit images. Conradt eventually ceased contact and did not try to meet this decoy. Thus Dateline and law enforcement came to Conradt’s residence to apprehend him. The police broke entry, and upon encountering Conradt, he shot himself dead. Conradt's death resulted in the prosecutor refusing to indict any other Dateline suspects, citing a failure by amateurs to produce evidence as well as their undue influence on law enforcement. Dateline ceased making further stories of To Catch A Predator. Conradt's sister in July 2007 filed a wrongful death lawsuit against NBC Universal which was settled for US$105 million in June 2008.

The federal judge who presided over the case stated that To Catch as Predator's operations created a "substantial risk of suicide" and that the show engaged "in tactics that were unnecessary and unwise, solely to generate more dramatic footage for a television show". The judge further described the show's conduct as "so outrageous and extreme that no civilized society should tolerate it" .

==== Vigilantism ====
===== Internet vigilantism =====
Following the cancellation of To Catch a Predator in 2007 and the spread of conspiracy theories about "grooming" and child sex trafficking on the internet, several vigilante groups were established in the United States. NBC News identified 30 groups in 2019, and subsequent research by the Washington Post found 160. A 2024 investigation by USA Today reported that such groups have operated in about three-quarters of the United States.

The typical procedures of anti-pedophile vigilante groups include posing as a minor on social media in order to lure an adult into a real-life confrontation, where they would be interrogated by the vigilantes. Such interrogations have often included heated exchanges, some of which have culminated into arguments and threats. When not enough remorse is shown, vigilantes have commonly threatened to call their target's wives or employers. If the target attempts to run away, they are followed to their homes by the vigilantes.

University of Winnipeg cultural criminologist Steven Kohm stated in 2019 that anti-pedophile vigilante groups have sought to restore the more emotional, punitive and participatory nature that the American criminal justice system had 100 years prior. He stated that their sense of mistrust in authority is analogous to that of conspiratorial campaigns such as QAnon and Pizzagate, among others. Kohm described those groups as having "a mob-justice vigilante mentality".

====== On social media ======
According to Wesleyan University digital vigilantism expert Mitali Thakor, vigilante groups have often used Facebook as a means to promote themselves on the internet. A statement by the social media company about the topic said that it does allow "people to use Facebook and our products to raise awareness about [...] those who may pose harm to children", but that it does not "want people to use Facebook to facilitate vigilante violence" or expose personal information. After being inquired about the topic by NBC News in 2019, Facebook banned several vigilante accounts and shut one vigilantism-related community down, although some groups remained on the platform after the ban wave.

Numerous videos of anti-pedophile vigilantism have been posted on video hosting websites. On YouTube, internet vigilantes such as SkeeterJean have posted their operations, which are styled after To Catch a Predator. On Kick, Vitaly Zdorovetskiy and other streamers have also livestreamed their operations in real time. In one of Zdorovetskiy's operations, he lured a person who had traveled with intent to meet a minor into an apartment, where Zdorovetskiy decided not to call the police and instead cut the man's hair and eyebrows in a way that, he stated, made him look like a clown. He told the man that he would let him go if he ate his pubic hair, and ultimately let him go.

Multiple short clips of vigilante stings have been posted on Instagram and YouTube, many of which feature content creators of the websites physically assaulting their targets. Those clips often get taken down due to policies regarding violent conduct. Perverted Justice's Xavier Von Erck said in 2024, regarding modern vigilante groups, that "there seems to be more of a motivation nowadays to expose these guys to enhance an individual's social media stature than there is to build an organization that can work with police and get arrests".

====== On Roblox ======
According to Bloomberg Businessweek, some of the online gaming platform Roblox have become "vigilante gamers" in response to Roblox's perceived poor moderation and failure to protect children. Ben Simon, known online by the pseudonym Ruben Sim, pushed for action against a game developer, publishing screenshots of his alleged child rape fantasies and sending a video compiling allegations to a Roblox employee.

In August 2025, Roblox Corporation issued a cease-and-desist letter to Schlep, a YouTuber prominent for conducting sting operations against alleged online predators via the platform, which has resulted in multiple arrests. Roblox Corporation's letter stated that the activities of Schlep and other vigilante streamers were a violation of the platform's terms of service and created an unsafe environment for users. Concurrent with the legal notice, Roblox terminated all accounts associated with Schlep and his group, and IP-banned him from the platform.

===== Vigilante violence =====
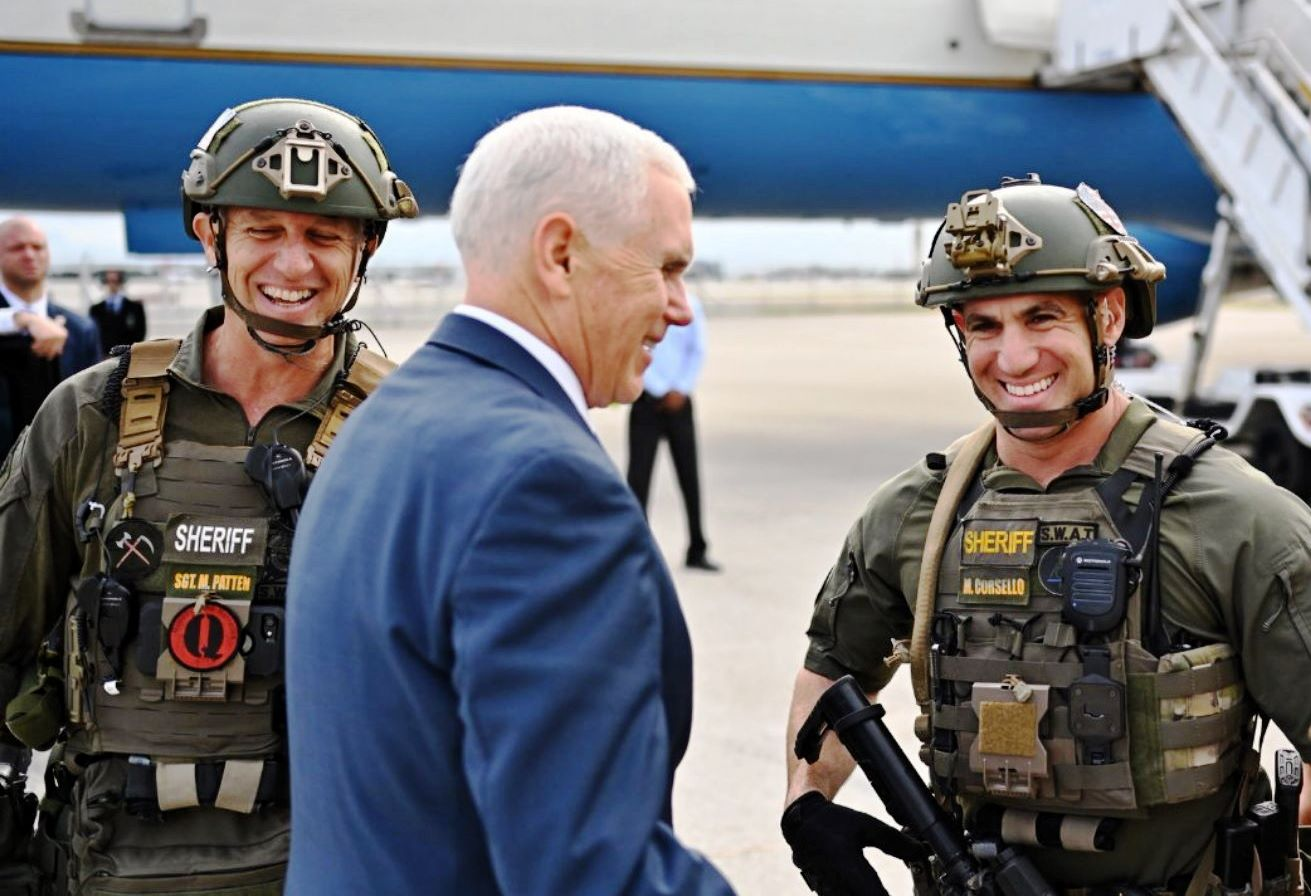
An American police officer (left) wearing a red QAnon badge while posing with American vice-president Mike Pence

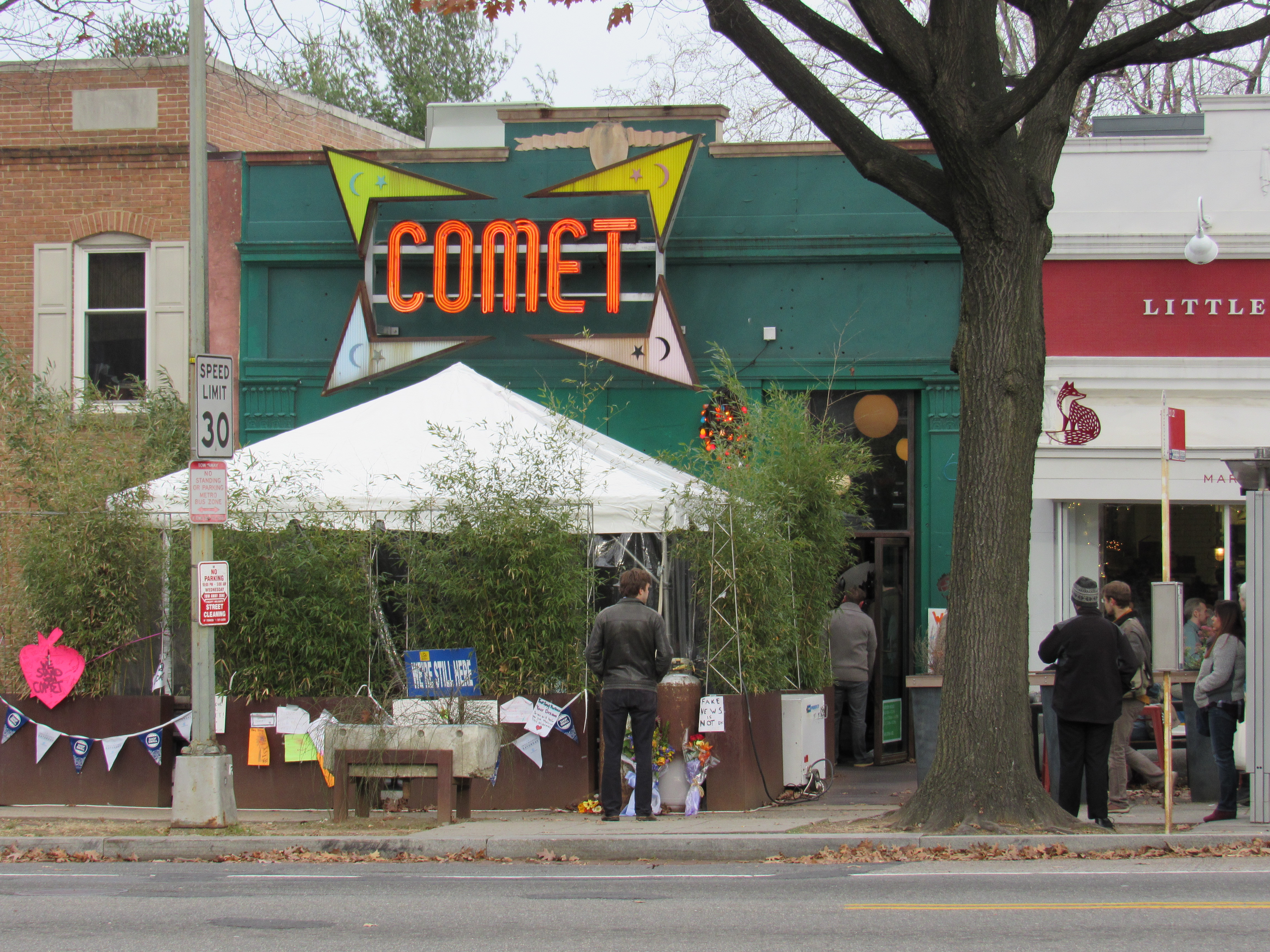
Site where the shooting took place, Comet Ping Pong

Instances of vigilante punishment and killing of pedophiles have been reported in the United States and United Kingdom, with anti-pedophile sentiments being used as justification for acts of violence. Some extremist right-wing movements also believe in the conspiracy theory that "patriots may have to resort to violence in order to save our country [from] Satan-worshiping pedophiles". In 2013, a far-right militant and his partner committed a double-homicide against a child sex offender and his wife, who was not a sex offender. In his manifesto, which was written before the murders took place, the vigilante justified the killing the man's wife by stating an intention to "purify the bloodline" by killing the family members of pedophiles.

In 2016, a 28-year-old father fired shots at Washington, D.C. pizzeria Comet Ping Pong after conspiracy theorists falsely reported that the restaurant was the headquarter of a child-trafficking ring. The perpetrator, Edgar Welch, was a believer of the Pizzagate conspiracy theory, which eventually evolved into QAnon, a conspiracy theory according to which there is an international cabal of Satanic pedophiles who run a global child sex-trafficking network.

=== In the United Kingdom ===
==== Media activism ====
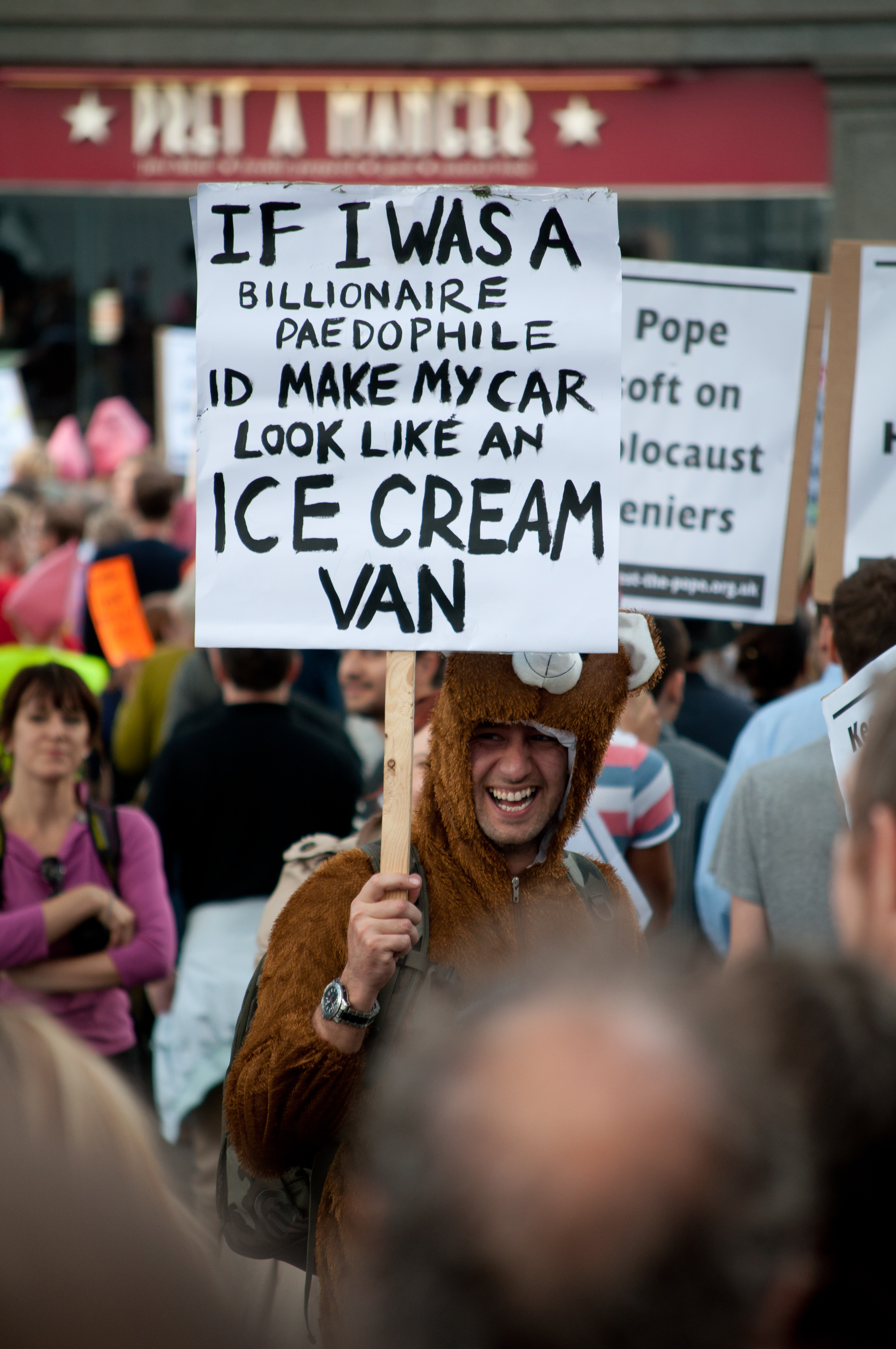
The trope of the "pedophile van" has been frequently reinforced by contemporary news media

The British media began publishing about pedophilia and child sexual abuse at high rates in the second half of the 1980s. In the 1990s and 2000s, the topic of pedophilia would be discussed on a daily basis by the British press, usually under an emotive, generalized and fearful way, which is especially the case in tabloid media. Some tabloid headlines have included "Vile sickos skulking in high places" (by the Daily Mirror), "Paedo caught by perv site" (The Sun), "Lonely heart sicko was a paedo" (The Sun), "My brave girl caged a monster" (The Sun), "Paedos have dodgy wiring" (The Sun), and "Pervs on the loose" (Daily Star). Broadsheet publications have also used the same type of emotive language, although to a lesser extent, with pedophiles often being described as monsters and beasts. British newspapers have also reinforced the stranger danger myth. In wake of the murder of Sarah Payne in 2000, British tabloid News of the World launched several anti-pedophile campaigns arguing for stricter government regulations.

Several true crime and television shows and documentaries centered on pedophiles were produced or broadcast in Britain during the 2000s, including Dispatches: Paedophiles (Channel 4), Police Protecting Children: Predatory Paedophiles (BBC), and No More Victims (BBC). Some productions, such as The Woodsman, have also focused on the lives of child sex offenders. In 2001, British comedian Chris Morris produced Paedogeddon, an episode of Brass Eye that satirized the media's sensationalistic construction of pedophiles. The episode became the most complained about television piece of its time, with the government signalling intent to increase media censorship and calls being made for Channel 4's license to broadcast being revoked. Several producers of the show received death threats, and bomb threats were also reported in some studios of the channel. The episode aired again in May 2002, reaching 1,5 million viewers (an increase of 200,000 compared to the first airing).

===== Name and Shame campaign =====
Locations where riots and vigilante group attacks related to name and shame took place

In July 2000, prominent British tabloid News of the World, owned by press magnate Rupert Murdoch, began running a campaign titled "Name and Shame", in which the newspaper published the identities and addresses of several men convicted of child sex crimes. Within two weeks of its launch, several lynch-mob and firebomb attacks had taken place in eleven communities in England and Scotland. Most attacks targeted people wrongfully identified as child sex offenders, including some who had similar names or looked similar to suspects depicted in the newspaper.

During the campaign, a riot involving 150 people broke out in Plymouth, in which people carried signs with News of the World headlines, attacked the police and destroyed property. In one instance during the campaign, a 42-year-old pediatrician from Gwent had her home attacked by vigilantes who mistook her professional title for the word "paedophile". In Berkshire, a group of 15 vigilantes chased and beat a 29-year-old man.

A group of mothers from Hampshire organized nightly marches and held "vigils" near the homes of people convicted of sexual offenses. In Paulsgrove, a life-size doll was hanged while protestors chanted "we'll lynch the pervs". A Greater Manchester man had his home surrounded by a mob of 300 people, who shouted "pedophile, rapist, beast, pervert" at him and dragged a six-year-old child to his door while asking "do you want this one?". A violent riot in Portsmouth resulted in several cars being set on fire and families leaving their homes due to safety concerns.

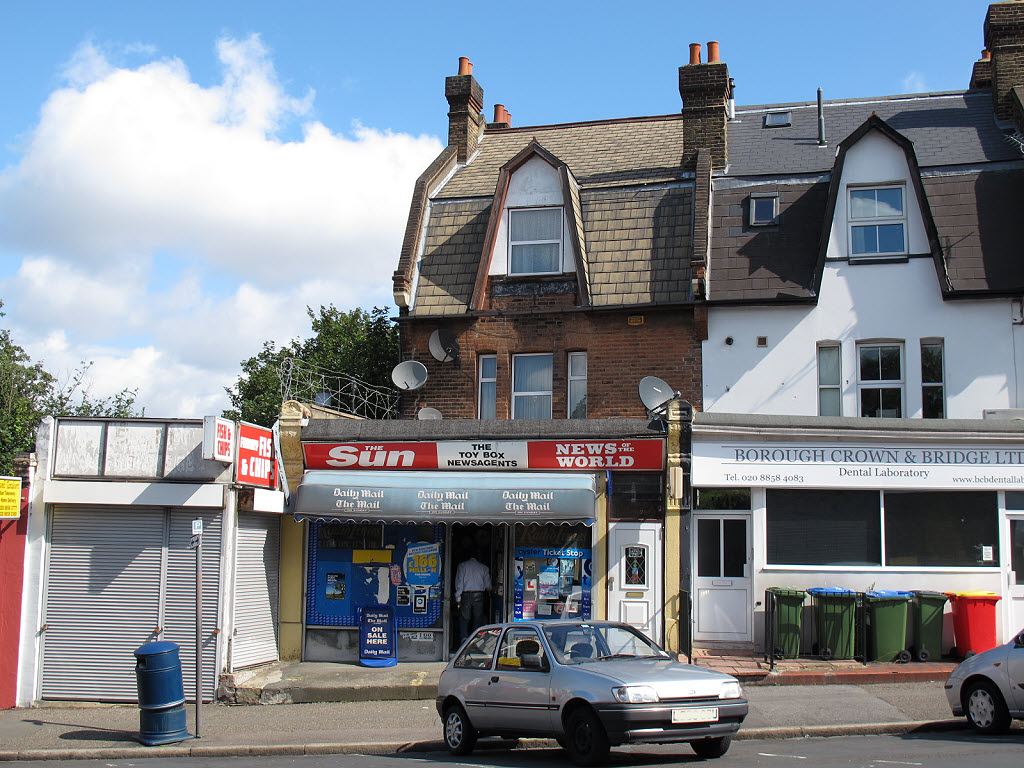
Newsagent shop selling News of the World newspapers in London

The campaign was condemned by police officials and human rights groups, it was also criticized by Home Office minister Paul Boateng. Having promised to expose the names of 100,000 people, Name and Shame was shut down in August after identifying 82 individuals and releasing a total of two issues.

===== Activism by local press =====
In the 1990s, local news outlets have sparked multiple protests against pedophiles in the United Kingdom, and many of the national headlines were initially reported on by local newspapers. These newspapers often employed provocative language in order to further fuel the protests. Some headlines from local press included "Angus mums on alert over local sex offender" (Press and Journal, 1998), "Parents besiege abuser’s house" (Press and Journal, 1997) and "Panic hits town over perverts" (Belfast Telegraph, 1997). A report from the Manchester Evening News featured an image of a sex offender in his broken car after, the newspaper reported, "a vigilante mob had vented their anger".

In the same decade, some local newspapers took the task of outing child sex offenders to their communities, causing mobs to attack them as well as their family members. In some instances, hotels were attacked, sometimes even when there were no sex offenders living in them. In one case, the wife and child of a sex offender had their home set on fire. In 1997, a young girl died when the house she was at was burned down by a mob of vigilantes. Another 81-year-old woman was driven out of her home after the Birmingham Evening Mail twice published the address of where she was living with her sex offender son. A 1997 piece from the Sunday Times reported "30 cases where men wrongly suspected of abusing children have been beaten and humiliated by gangs".

==== Internet vigilantism ====
There were 191 anti-pedophile vigilante groups in 2019, five years after the release of The Paedophile Hunter in 2014. Activities performed by such groups have been characterized by academics as expressive forms of digital vigilantism (sometimes referred to as digilantism), in which vigilantes attempt to portray themselves in a desirable light to society. Researcher James Farrell described "pedophile hunting" in the UK as a form of "spectacle" performed to internet audiences. In her analysis of The Pedophile Hunter, Elaine Campbell described these groups' activities as "tiny theaters of punishment".

People targeted by vigilante groups have been subjected to physical violence and harassment, and some have died by suicide after being accused of sexual crimes. Family members of those targeted by vigilante groups have been documented to experience social ostracism, humiliation and psychological trauma. Anti-pedophile vigilante groups have been widely condemned by police, they have also been described as undermining police investigations due to improper handling of evidence. According to the BBC, 150 out of the 302 prosecutions related to child grooming in 2017 involved evidence obtained by vigilante groups. As of 2020, there were about 90 vigilante groups in the United Kingdom.

University of East Anglia's law school lecturer Joe Purshouse stated that anti-pedophile vigilantes have "[manufactured] criminality", conducted punishments, and jeopardized their targets' rights to a fair trial. In his academic paper, Purshouse stated that such groups have conducted "sustained social media attacks on the alleged perpetrators and their family members". He further said that British government agencies have "[turned] a blind eye", and sometimes offered tacit approval, to the manners by which evidence have been gathered by vigilante groups.

Some British vigilante groups have used evidence against their targets for purposes of blackmailing, leading people accused of sex crimes to ATMs in order to extort their money. Chief constable Simon Bailey stated in 2020 that those groups have "led to people being blackmailed, people being subject of grievous bodily harm, the wrong people being accused, people committing suicide as a result of interventions, family lives being completely destroyed, in the name of what? Facebook likes."

=== In Russia ===
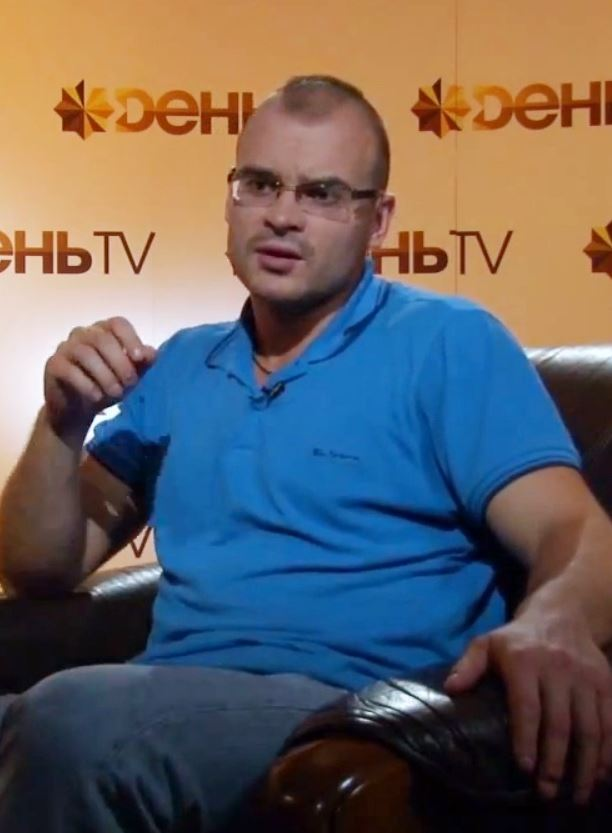
Martsinkevich in 2012

In 2012, Russian neo-Nazi Maxim Martsinkevich launched the Occupy Pedophilia project, in which neo-Nazi vigilantes would pose as young boys on the internet in order to lure adult men, who would then be made to indicate their identity and address in front of cameras. In some instances, vigilantes would write "Fuck LGBT" or draw the rainbow flag on the foreheads of their targets, who would sometimes also be shouted at, slapped, have their heads shaved or be forced to drink urine, among other forms of torture. Occupy Pedophilia often conflated homosexuality with pedophilia.

=== In Canada ===
Canada-based criminologist Wade Deisman, who has studied anti-pedophile vigilante groups in Canada, stated that many of such groups are formed by sexual abuse survivors. He further said that these groups, which he described as resembling "gangs", have been fed by a "bubble of hysteria". "It's like we are back in the middle ages and people are coming with torches", he stated.

A 2017 investigation by W5 stated that Canadian anti-pedophile vigilante group Creep Catchers had manipulated chat messages in order to incriminate their targets, who would then have their identities posted on the internet by the group. In 2016, a woman died by suicide after being confronted by the group, and another person had been wrongly accused of sexual crimes by the organization. Canadian law professor Benjamin Perrin described Creep Catchers' operations as "justice as entertainment".

In 2023, several members of a vigilante group in Quebec were arrested under charges related to false imprisonment, harassment and distribution of child pornography. According to police, the group's activities included transmitting pornographic material of children in order to lure their targets over social media.

=== In Germany ===
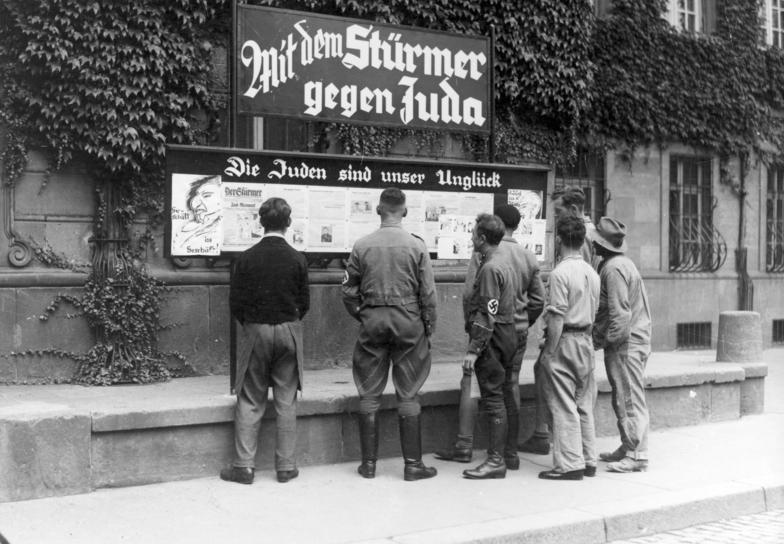
Men standing in front of a Der Stürmer advertising box, 1935

During the German Nazi regime, the already existing discourse regarding pedophilia was re-shaped by Nazi narratives about the government's fight against crime, homosexuals and Jews. During that time, political campaigners often presented pedophilia as a specifically Jewish or gay phenomenon. The German newspaper Der Stürmer was often used to fuel accusations of sexual assault of children by Jews, and in some cases implicitly called for violence against the alleged perpetrators. The narrative of protecting children, specifically "Aryan" children, from sexual assault was further instrumentalized against queers, people with disabilities and people labeled as "antisocial".

In the 21st century, right-wing groups further instrumentalized the existing discourse regarding pedophilia against minority groups such as queer and transgender people. Many of such groups have also adopted the American Qanon conspiracy narrative that had spread to German-speaking audiences during the COVID-19 crisis, as well as other conspiracy theories regarding pedophile cabals.

In 2010, a television show in which pedophiles were lured and exposed was criticized by child protection organizations and government officials after one person whose identity it had exposed on the internet went missing, with his family stating that he could have died by suicide. The show was hosted by Stephanie zu Guttenberg and televised by tabloid channel RTL2.

=== In the Netherlands ===
About 250 reports of vigilante pedophile hunting activities were made to Dutch authorities between July and November 2020. After a 73-year-old man was beaten to death by a group of vigilantes in November of the same year, the police issued a statement against anti-pedophile vigilantism. In another instance, a vigilante pseudonymously known as Eren G. accused a man of attempting to meet a teenager and forced him to do ten push-ups as punishment. The same vigilante had previously been convicted of coercion, trespassing, libel, and assault after he broke into the house of one of his targets in 2021.

In 2023, a Dutch man was arrested and investigated by police after he stated that he was a pedophile. After he received death threats, the police published a statement discouraging vigilantism.

=== In Brazil ===
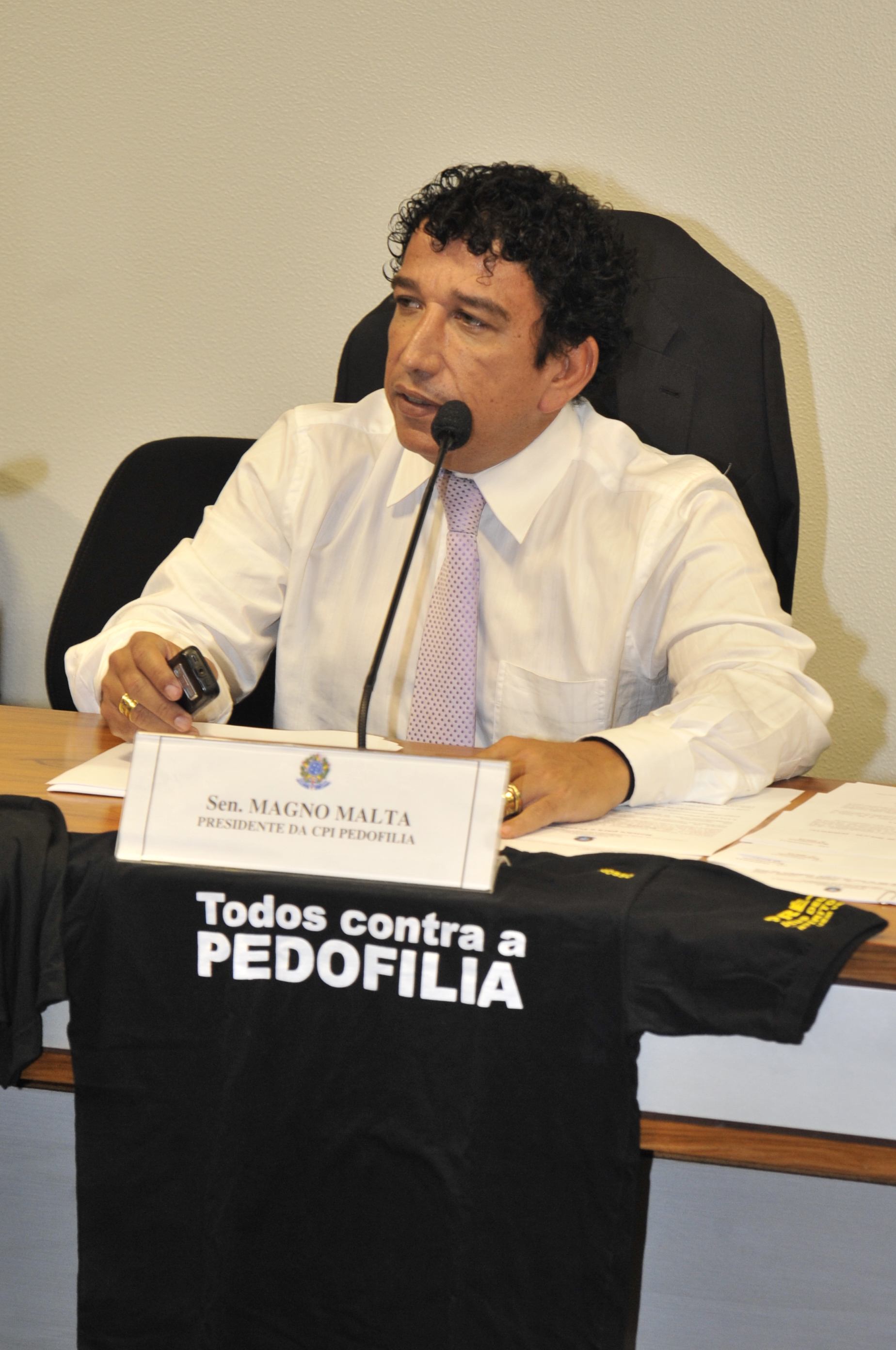
Magno Malta during the federal committee in May 2010

The sexual aspect of child abuse began gaining prominence in Brazil in the late 1990s. By the mid 2000s, the topic of child pornography on the internet also started gaining notoriety. In 2008, the Federal Senate launched a Parliamentary Inquiry Committee to investigate the topic of "pedophilia on the internet", which lasted until 2010. The committee was led by evangelical senator Magno Malta, who described his efforts as an "anti-pedophilia crusade". It resulted in the nationwide criminalization of child pornography and the requirement that Internet providers and social media companies provide confidential user information to Brazilian authorities upon their request. Malta initially intended to pass a bill criminalizing pedophilic fantasies and sexual desires, but that objective was ultimately shut down by the committee advisors.

Another state-level Parliamentary Inquiry Committee regarding pedophilia was established by the Legislative Assembly of Pará in 2008.

=== In Australia ===
Following the rise of online vigilante groups overseas, "pedo hunter" groups have been established across Australia. This is despite there being some legal issues surrounding the subject.

It has been reported that anti-LGBTQ vigilante gangs of teenagers purported themselves to be paedophile hunters to engage in gay bashing. Instead of targeting individuals who were evidently breaking the law, these groups falsely made gay men confess to being paedophiles and organising meetings so they could be tortured and robbed. Members of these gangs hold the false view that LGBTQ people are paedophiles.

=== In Austria ===
On 28 and 29 May 2026 five self-declared "hunters of child-abusers" were sentenced at Salzburg Regional Court to lengthy prison terms. Four of them (age 21–25; three males, one female) were found guilty for attempted murder for aggression against two middle aged men in October 2024 in Lend.

=== In Bulgaria ===
A Bulgarian group commonly described in the media as the “Pedophile Hunters” became active around 2020. One of its publicly identified members was Alen Simeonov. Members posed as minors on dating platforms and social media, communicated with adults who allegedly expressed a sexual interest in children, and arranged filmed confrontations that were later published online. In March 2022, Bulgarian police stated that evidence collected by the group had contributed to a nationwide operation in which 21 people were detained for suspected sexual offences involving minors. Investigators said that 25 individuals had been identified in the group’s recordings.

In August 2026, a 37-year-old man died after being assaulted near Youth Hill in Plovdiv. Prosecutors alleged that a group of minors had arranged the meeting after presenting one of its members online as a 15-year-old girl. Authorities said that the suspects regarded the man as a pedophile and were imitating social-media “pedophile hunter” groups. Five minors were charged with intentional murder; the proceedings remained ongoing as of August 2026.

== Corporate and government activity ==
=== Policing on the internet ===
With the popularization of the Internet in the United Kingdom and the OECD, criminal justice procedures against child sex offenders have become more exclusionary and retributive, with the intensification of punishment, the reduction of legal rights and the increase of summary orders and prohibitions. According to Majid Yar, the highly dispersed involvement of non-state actors such as internet service providers, social media companies and other private organizations in the policing of pedophilic activities on the internet "effectively bypasses direct involvement of state actors" in such investigations, ultimately leaving the police "at a distance".

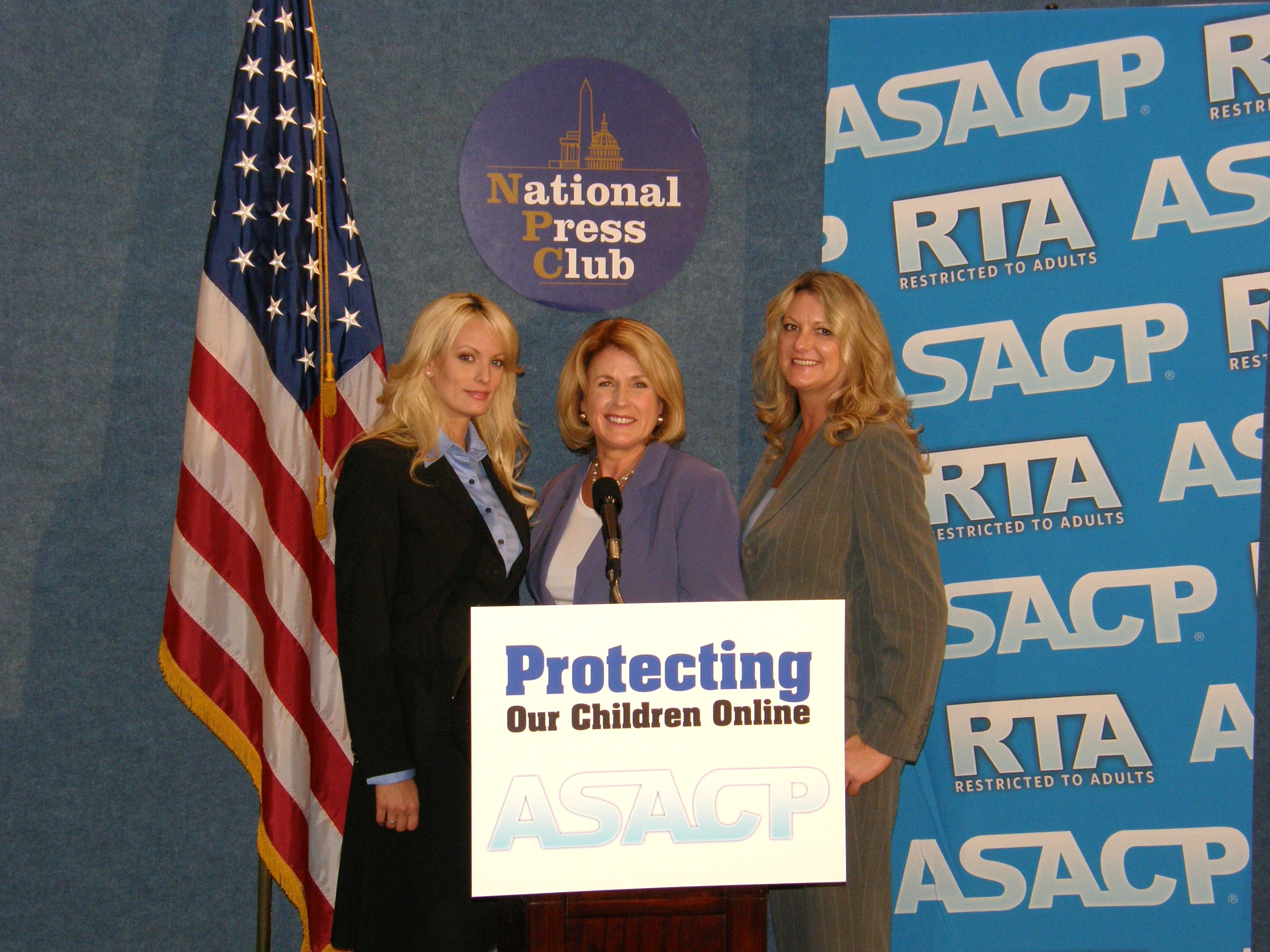
Stormy Daniels, Joan Irvine, and Joy King at a ASACP conference in 2008

In British society, the distributed system of policing against pedophilia on the internet has been composed by sex offender registries, public and private transnational policing organizations (such as ECPAT, the Association of Sites Advocating Child Protection (ASACP), the Internet Watch Foundation and the Internet Hotline Providers in Europe), national policing units (such as the Child Exploitation and Online Protection Command) and "anti-pedophile software" (such as Net Nanny, Cyber Sitter and Safe Eyes).

American law requires social media companies such as Facebook, Twitter and YouTube to report instances of child pornography that are uploaded to their services. A report by the National Center for Missing and Exploited Children stated that the organization had received 1 million monthly reports of child pornography on the internet in 2019 and 2 million a year later.

The European Union discussed in 2023 a bundle of regulations that would compel social media companies to scan their users' private communications for child pornography. The proposed regulations were described by hundreds of academics and experts as threatening user privacy and being detrimental to democracy, with the European Data Protection Supervisor saying that it would lead to an indiscriminate scanning of private data of EU citizens.

=== Killing and castration of pedophiles ===
Some countries such as South Korea, Indonesia and Kazakhstan, as well as some U.S. states, have passed laws that required chemical or surgical castration of pedophiles.

US map of states that have passed Death Penalty laws for child rapists as of 2026, though it will be judicially unenforceable unless Kennedy v. Louisiana is overturned.

In May 2023, Florida Governor Ron DeSantis signed a bill that allows the possibility of the death penalty for the rape of a child under 12 years of age, though it will be judicially unenforceable unless Kennedy v. Louisiana is overturned. In 2024, Tennessee passed a similar law. In 2025, Idaho passed a similar law.

According to the federal Bureau of Justice Statistics, about 83,000 state prison inmates in the United States were child sex offenders. Some members of this population have been targeted and sometimes killed by other inmates. A report by the Associated Press stated that despite male sex offenders being 15% of the California prison population, they accounted for one-third of the 78 homicide victims in the state between 2007 and 2015.

=== Sex offender registration ===
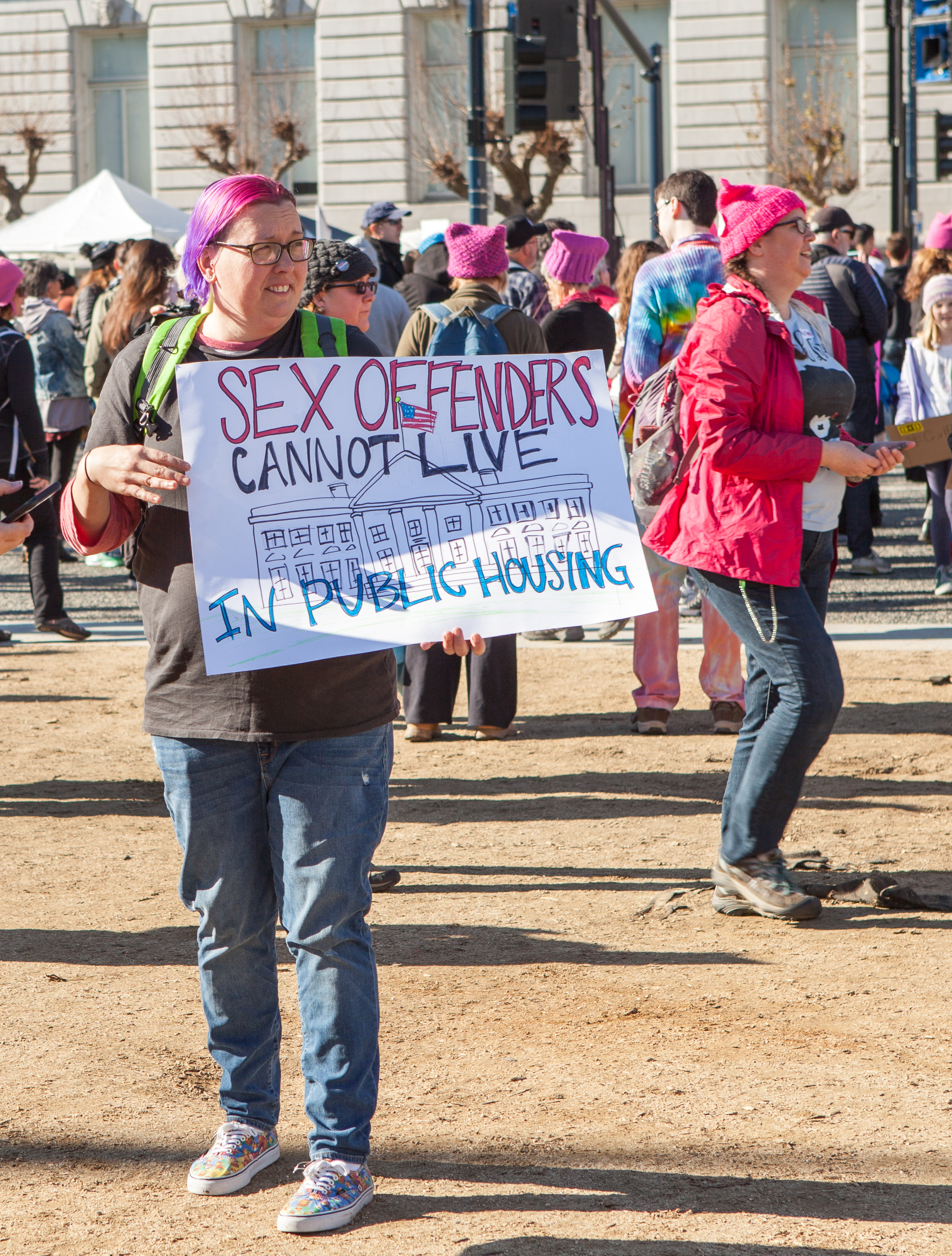
A protestor in California holding a sign that reads "Sex offenders cannot live in public housing"

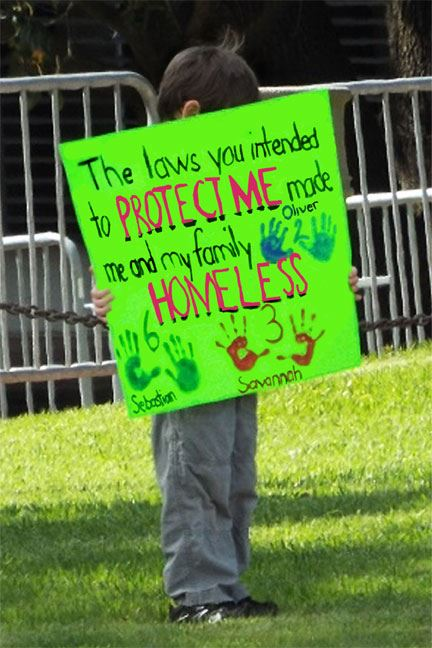
A child at a protest against sex offender policies in Florida

Following a series of notorious child abduction and rape cases in the 1980s and 1990s, several U.S. states enacted sexual predator and civil commitment laws, with pedophile-free zones also being established. In 1996, American president Bill Clinton signed a law requiring all U.S. states to establish a public sex offender registry in each state.

There is little scientific evidence that American sex offender registration laws and related policies have been effective at deterring sex crimes, and the constitutionality of such laws is disputed. Despite popular beliefs, sex offenders have lower recidivism rates than other types of criminals.

Sex offender registration laws have also been implemented in the United Kingdom after 1996. The introduction of such laws gave place to debates regarding the monitoring and supervision of registrants, as well as their rights to housing (the legality of which was disputed) and whether such registries should be open to the public. The British government's refusal to make sex offender registries public was one of the factors that led to News of The World's name and shame campaign in 2000.

Other countries that have enacted sex offender registration laws include Australia, Canada, France, Japan and South Korea.

== Societal attitudes ==
According to a 2014 study, a significant minority of English- and German-speaking samples reported that pedophiles should receive legal punishment regardless of whether they ever committed any crime, and that many members of the population believe that pedophilia is controllable. A 2016 report analyzed the proposal that the stigma attached to pedophilia may have a detrimental effect in child sexual abuse prevention.

In a large German survey, 14% of participants responded that a given pedophile should better be dead and 39% endorsed their imprisonment even though the instructors explicitly stated that the pedophile in question had never committed any crime. Another English sample reported that 27% and 49% of its participants answered the same about the death and imprisonment of pedophiles, respectively. In comparison, 21% and 8% of the English sample answered the same about people with antisocial disorder. A 2014 study reported that participants tended to desire pedophiles to be socially isolated more than other groups of people "whose mental condition will arguably put them at an increased risk of violating the rights of third persons", such as alcoholics.

Although there is no inherent link between pedophilia and child sexual abuse, and up to 80% of people incarcerated for child sexual abuse crimes are not pedophiles, the perceived association between the two among laypersons has been a major factor in aggravating negative social attitudes toward pedophilia. Furthermore, the discredited idea that pedophiles can choose who they find sexual attractive, which one-third of the participants of one survey agreed, has also been reported to play a factor in negative and punitive attitudes against pedophilia. This result is consistent with the core assumptions of attribution theory, according to which the perceived intentionality of a person is positively associated with the assignment of blame against them by the general public.

In a British sample from 2004, taken after the Name and Shame campaign, 58% of participants believed that the press had created a "witch-hunt" against pedophiles. This response is consistent with academic literature, which suggests that the British press had created and reinforced a moral panic in the country at the time. The same proportion of participants also agreed that pedophiles are "evil".

== List of vigilante groups ==
=== Perverted-Justice ===
Perverted-Justice was an anti-pedophilia group with the stated mission to expose and convict adults who solicit and groom minors on the Internet. Perverted Justice had multiple issues with being able to supply chat log evidence in a manner that passes legal scrutiny. Perverted Justice collaborated with the NBC television program Dateline in their segment To Catch A Predator, hosted by Chris Hansen, to lure alleged sexual predators to a sting house by interacting with them online and posing as minors.

=== Jewish Community Watch ===
Jewish Community Watch, a global New York City-based organization with an office in Israel, focusing on prevention of child sexual abuse in the Orthodox Jewish community, received mixed support over their posting the names of suspected pedophiles on their main website. The column titled the "Wall of Shame" listed the names of individuals suspected of abuse, their photos and testimonies from alleged victims.

=== Predator Poachers ===
Predator Poachers, a Houston-based vigilante group, claimed that as of 2022, its activity had led to arrests in 27 U.S. states. The group was responsible for exposing comedian and content creator Bryant Moreland, more commonly known by his online alias EDP445, for allegedly talking to one of their decoys in 2021. Their operation later resulted in the arrest of Moreland in 2026. The group was permanently banned from YouTube after the event due to policy violations.

=== Dads Against Predators ===
One group, Dads Against Predators (also known as DAP, Inc. or D.A.P.) was founded in Ohio and appears to be active in a number of states, utilizing similar tactics to other groups in running 'sting operations' on online dating and social networking sites or applications. They have been criticized by law enforcement on several occasions for the tactics used in their sting operations. DAP tends to be more aggressive when confronting alleged predators, berating them in public, causing a scene, and at times even fighting with or physically restraining the individuals they confront, though usually any physical contact is started first by the alleged predator. They have been widely criticized as utilizing unethical or even dangerous methods, and do not always involve law enforcement in their stings, as is usually done by other groups. In one particularly chaotic confrontation, one of the members of Dads Against Predators was shot inside a Target store located in Winston-Salem, North Carolina. According to the man alleged to have fired a round, three men confronted him inside of the store and began to assault him, and during this fight he fired a single shot which struck Jay C. Carnicom of Fremont, Ohio before being disarmed by another member of the group. The bullet struck Carnicom in the leg, though apparently the wound was not fatal or particularly serious as Carnicom did not seek medical care until a day later. The three men who carried out this confrontation have had arrest warrants issued for them in North Carolina in connection to the fight. Dads Against Predators have been banned from several retail chains as a result of their disruptive, boisterous and frequently violent confrontations. Dads Against Predators has also been accused of playing a role in at least three suicides carried out by alleged predators who were confronted by D.A.P shortly before their deaths.

A Michigan man from Pontiac named Robert Wayne Lee, 40, known under the alias 'Boopac Shakur' online, was shot and killed inside of a restaurant in Oakland County during a confrontation which started as the result of an online predator 'sting' operation. Allegedly, when Lee confronted two teenagers (17 and 18 years old) inside the restaurant, one of the men produced a knife and the other pulled a handgun after Lee struck one of the men. After the confrontation became physical, Lee was shot several times by the younger man and was transported to the hospital where he later succumbed to his injuries. Lee left behind two daughters and a son, who he claimed inspired him to participate in his vigilante activities. Lee was well-known online for his aggressive vigilantism, frequently physically assaulting alleged predators, vandalizing their property or slashing tires on their vehicles so they could not leave the area. Funds were raised via GoFundMe to pay for his funeral costs. The two teenagers involved in the fatal fight and shooting were later tracked down and arrested.

=== Others ===
Another initiative, Predator Hunter, headed by Wendell Kreuth, aims to track down and expose the pornography-related activities of alleged 'sexual predators', as disclosed in his interview with Minnesota Public Radio. The activities of Predator Hunter in the previous years garnered more attention, particularly the actions of Bradley Willman, whose anti-pedophile activism is described below:

Between 1997 and 2001, Brad Willman was known as Omni-Potent, an Internet vigilante who would track pedophiles by spending 16-plus hours a day hacking into people's computers from his parents’ house in Langley, a suburban community just outside Vancouver. Ultimately, he was responsible for the arrests of about 40 pedophiles across Canada and the U.S. Willman's successful, albeit unpaid and short-lived venture as "Citizen Tipster," as he was known by police, is now over. But his activities have sparked intense debate over the legality of his tactics.

He would verify where suspects were from, and send the information on to Predator-Hunter, an online pedophile watchdog group that would, in turn, send it to other sources to be verified before passing it on to police. "Parents in a number of countries, I think, owe OmniPotent a debt of gratitude for what he did," says Wendell Krueth, president of Predator-Hunter. The end justifying the means is a concept Predator-Hunter supports. "We don't tell people to go hack, but we consider whatever information we get worthy in taking down pedophiles," Krueth says.

POP Squad ("POP" standing for "Prey on Predators"), a Connecticut-based group, is one of several similar online groups operating in the United States.

== See also ==
- Ephebophilia
- Hebephilia
- John Wojnowski
