= Dark Justice (group) =

UK vigilante group working to catch paedophiles

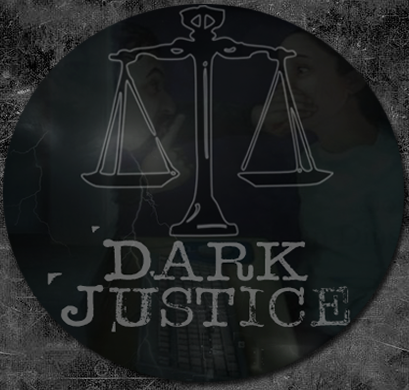
- Type: Organisation
- Founded: 30 October 2014
- Defunct: 24 May 2021
- Area served: United Kingdom; mainly North East England
- Website: Official Website

Dark Justice (founded on 30 October 2014) were a vigilante group set up to catch paedophiles based in Newcastle upon Tyne operated by two men using the pseudonyms Scott (born 1991) and Callum (1994–2021). Neither were police officers, although their tactics were similar to those sometimes used by police. The duo posed online as children, normally between the ages of 11 and 15, in order to catch online child groomers. When they met a child groomer in real life, the members of Dark Justice wore bulletproof vests. Their evidence was used in court, resulting in convictions against over 115 online groomers including Roger Lee, and Barry Scott. In May 2018, the Evening Chronicle reported that Dark Justice have secured over 150 arrests with over 40 of those being jailed.

The two men met each other through Scott's brother. Prior to starting Dark Justice, both men worked in the digital media industry.

During 2017, an anonymous businessman gave Dark Justice an office in Newcastle to serve as the group's new base of operations.

Dark Justice were not paid for their work and instead received support from their families and used money that they had in savings, as well as receiving donations to their website to fund their work.

In mid 2017, Dark Justice won a landmark high court judgment to continue their work and judge Brian Langstaff concluded that the members of Dark Justice had "acted as private citizens throughout". Of the outcome, Dark Justice said "It could have been terrible but we are thrilled the judge has sided with us".

In 2019, a landmark ruling was passed meaning that online groomers would now face the same sentence regardless of whether or not the child they attempted to meet was real. Of the ruling, Dark Justice said it was "brilliant and a great move forward within the law".

In April 2021, Scott announced that Callum had died in a "tragic accident" and that the organisation would cease operating.

== See also ==
- Dads Against Predators
