= EDP445 =

American former YouTuber and alleged child predator (born 1990)

- Moreland in The Sick Mind of EDP445 (2026)
- Born: Bryant Turhan Emmerson Moreland; December 15, 1990 (age 35); Bakersfield, California, U.S.
- Other name: EatDatPussy445
- Occupation: Former YouTube personality
- Years active: 2010–2026
- Criminal charges: Attempt to commit lewd acts upon a child; Meeting a minor for lewd purposes; Contacting a minor with intent to commit a sexual offense; Distribution of pornography to a minor
- Criminal status: In custody awaiting hearing

YouTube information
- Channel: EDP445
- Genres: NFL commentary; comedy
- Subscribers: 2.01 million (at termination)
- Views: 179 million (at termination)

Bryant Turhan Emmerson Moreland (born December 15, 1990), known online as EDP445, (Note: EDP is an initialism for EatDatPussy445.) or simply EDP, is an American former YouTuber. He rose to prominence online for his rant videos about the National Football League and the Philadelphia Eagles, garnering a cult following. Known for his vulgar language, Moreland and his videos also made several guest appearances on national television during his career.

On April 18, 2021, Moreland was caught in a sting operation conducted by the online vigilante group Predator Poachers, for allegedly attempting to meet with a minor for sexual relations, resulting in his main channel being terminated and online backlash. Since then, Moreland has been involved in several other controversies. He was the subject of the 2026 documentary film The Sick Mind of EDP445, directed by Mike Clum, where he discusses his life and controversies. The admissions in this documentary led to his arrest on November 4, 2026, for which he is facing sex-related felony charges against children.

== Early life ==
Bryant Turhan Emmerson Moreland was born on December 15, 1990, in Bakersfield, California. According to Moreland, since watching the November 30, 1997, game in which the Philadelphia Eagles defeated the Cincinnati Bengals, with his father, he has been a passionate Philadelphia Eagles fan. Moreland spent much of his childhood moving between Los Angeles and Bakersfield, attending high school in Los Angeles before permanently returning to Bakersfield in 2009. Before his YouTube success, Moreland had a job at Walmart, but eventually quit to focus on YouTube.

== YouTube career ==
Moreland was known for his outspoken support of the Philadelphia Eagles, creating rant videos about them. He began uploading in 2010; by 2012, Moreland had amassed an audience, which the magazine Philadelphia described as a "cult following among Eagles fans."

Initially known in sports circles, his videos spread and gained popularity in various internet communities starting in 2015, due to a video entitled "Eagles Trade MCCOY, right?" The video was previewed on MTV's Ridiculousness with LeSean McCoy later that year on May 28. Older videos, including some that were deleted, also received attention, such as "I flooded the toilet in Chipotle". He was described as becoming "something of a meme" online.

Black Information Network's Zuri Anderson described him as "[breaking] into the mainstream" with his features on Comedy Central's Tosh.0 television series and The Howard Stern Show; the former of which included him as a guest multiple times. Moreland was also featured in the 2020 documentary film Maybe Next Year, which focused on the team and its fans. Moreland owned multiple YouTube channels, which were each made for a specific type of content. Moreland also made videos on the personalized video-sharing website Cameo, which were highlighted by The Philadelphia Inquirer in February 2020. He had roughly 2 million subscribers as of April 2021.

=== Content style ===
Moreland's content covered the NFL, where he commonly criticized team casting decisions. His content style revolved around ranting and confessions, frequently using profanity. He often expressed physically intense anger and frustration over the Philadelphia Eagles' performance, describing them as the "scapegoat of [his] failures" in Maybe Next Year. Moreland also created vlogs and mukbangs, alongside his rants.

== Legal issues ==
=== Background ===
Moreland was accused of contacting minors in 2020 by a fellow YouTuber. On April 18, 2021, Moreland was confronted by online vigilantes Alex Rosen and 'Ghost' in Bakersfield, California. They claimed that he was attempting to meet someone he believed to be a 13-year-old girl, after sending sexual messages to a decoy account in the weeks prior. Moreland set all of his videos to private on April 24, 2021, and YouTube terminated his other channels three days later. The sting resulted in a case against Moreland, which was later dropped because of "the lack of cooperation from the reporting parties." The 2021 sting was also nicknamed the "cupcake incident" because of a statement he made during it, stating that he came there to "pick up a cupcake." As Broad Street Review noted, it also led to his removal from Maybe Next Year. In October 2023, Moreland was confronted again during an amateur sting operation by YouTubers JiDion and Skeeter Jean. Kayla, a 15-year-old girl, claimed that Moreland sent her sexual images and videos. Kayla later recounted that she "felt pressured to continue communicating with Moreland at the urging of [JiDion]", which he denies.

In the years following his deplatforming, Moreland made several attempts to return to public content creation through independent websites and alternative handles, most of which were terminated by host platforms. Two YouTube channels were later created, both of which were terminated. By February 2022, Moreland made a now-removed Twitter account, streamed on the app Bigo Live, and uploaded on TikTok, receiving substantial viewership on the latter. In March 2023, Moreland released an interview with an AI-generated voice, where he claimed that his exposure was a coordinated "set-up" from a production studio impersonator, using allegedly fake emails and documents as proof. However, media outlets and online commentators disputed his defense.

==== The Sick Mind of EDP445 ====
Moreland speaking in The Sick Mind of EDP445 (left), where he is interviewed by television presenter Chris Hansen (right)

Director Mike Clum released a trailer for a documentary featuring Moreland on July 26, 2026. On August 9, The Sick Mind of EDP445 was released on YouTube. The documentary covers Moreland's life and controversies, and includes a segment where he was interviewed by television presenter and journalist Chris Hansen, known for formerly hosting the television series To Catch a Predator. During the interview, Moreland admitted to "trying to have sex" with who he believed to be a 13-year-old girl in the 2021 sting operation, further stating "I knew that it was wrong [...] I knew that it was something that was highly illegal that shouldn't be done." Additionally, Amanda Holpuch of The New York Times described some of Moreland's comments in the documentary as homophobic and misogynistic, including his repeated use of the slur faggot. The documentary prompted the Kern County District Attorney's Office to reopen the case from the 2021 sting.

=== 2026 arrest ===
Mike Clum, director of the documentary that prompted renewed investigative attention to Moreland's 2021 case

In an account by JiDion, he and his team located Moreland after being informed about Moreland's arrest warrant. After that, JiDion reportedly shared his whereabouts with the police and recorded the arrest on his Instagram, and also announced it on his YouTube channel the day Moreland got arrested.

Moreland was arrested in the Las Vegas Valley, Nevada, outside of a dialysis clinic on November 4, 2026, by the Henderson Police Department alongside the Las Vegas Metropolitan Police Department. According to a filing by the Kern County District Attorney's Office, Moreland faces four felony charges related to sex crimes against children in connection with the 2021 sting. After his arrest, he was placed in custody in Nevada. The New York Times, USA Today, Fox 5, and People reported on the role of The Sick Mind of EDP445 in the renewed investigation for its contributions to the arrest, as it featured admissions preceding his arrest.

On November 9, Moreland appeared at Las Vegas Justice Court, where he agreed to an extradition to California. On the 19th, Moreland was put in custody in Kern County, California, on a $30,000 bail, appearing in court the following day. On his behalf, he pleaded not guilty. In court, Moreland's bail was increased to $300,000, which his public defenders challenged, claiming that it was influenced by media coverage and that Moreland posed no risk of bodily harm. However, Judge Chad Louie stated that Moreland could be dangerous to those involved in the sting operation. Moreland's hearing date is set for December 4, 2026.

==== Dispute ====
The arrest prompted a dispute between Alex Rosen and the Kern County District Attorney's Office. While the Kern County District Attorney's Office claims that the case for the 2021 sting operation was dropped because of a lack of cooperation from the reporting party, Rosen says that his online group provided evidence in the form of chat records and account access. In an interview with News 3, Rosen criticized the district attorney's office, alleging that with the access given, "they had everything they needed in order to prosecute [Moreland]," sharing screenshots of emails between himself and the office with the publication.

== Personal life and public image ==
Moreland once discussed fellow YouTubers, including Cold Raven, Alex Rosen, JiDion, and Skeeter Jean, on a board he referred to as his "kill list." According to Briefly, Moreland confirmed that he had stage five kidney failure in early December 2022. He reiterated this claim during The Sick Mind of EDP445 in 2026.

Before the controversy, Moreland built a fanbase through exaggeration, profanity usage, and emotion. However, the 2021 sting operation prompted online backlash. Director Mike Clum stated that although Moreland did not face legal action for it, he did receive widespread backlash and lost employment. Later media coverage described him as an "infamous YouTuber" and a "controversial" figure.
