= John Wojnowski =

Anti-pedophile activist

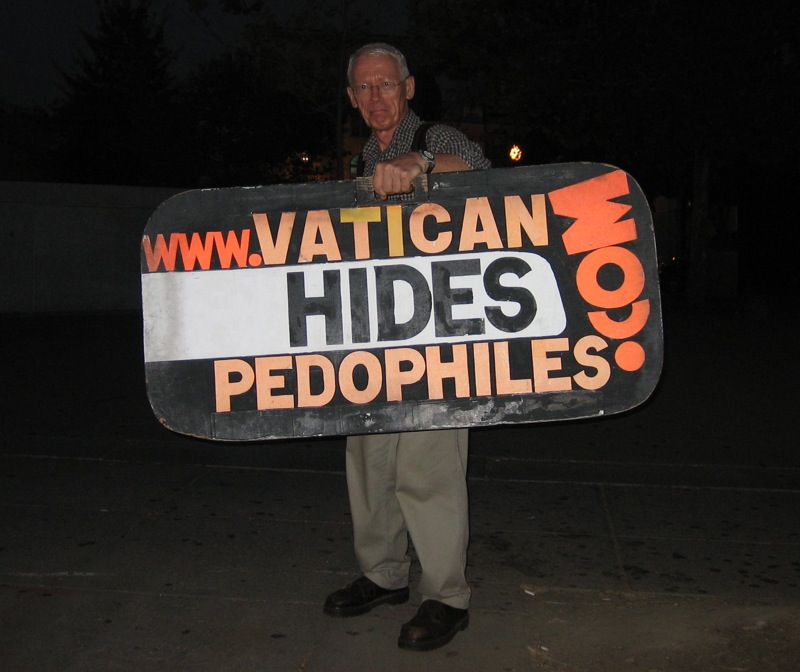
Wojnowski with his sign in 2006

John Wojnowski (born 1943 in Warsaw, Poland) is an anti-pedophile activist who has maintained a one-man protest outside the Apostolic nunciature in Washington D.C. since 1998. Wojnowski, a retired ironworker, stands on Massachusetts Avenue during afternoon rush hour holding signs with slogans protesting Catholic child sexual abuse.

== Biography ==
Wojnowski's father was a librarian for a Catholic university in Italy. Wojnowski and his two younger brothers grew up in Italy and attended Catholic schools. When he was 14 or 15, he and his brothers spent a month camping alone in the mountains. According to Wojnowski, a village priest in the area offered to tutor him in Latin, and while he was visiting the rectory sexually molested him.

He failed to finish school, and at age 18 left Italy for Canada, where he worked at odd jobs. He came to the United States in 1963, where he served in the U.S. Army and worked as a laborer. He met his wife on a 1968 trip to Poland and had two children with her. Wojnowski says his wife left him after 30 years when ironworker jobs became scarce in the 1990s. He lists his past inability to keep a job as just one of many consequences of his alleged molestation; "It was so traumatizing. I repressed the memory of that moment, but I ruined my life. My temper changed, my appearance changed. I was avoiding people. I felt so insecure, I never talked to anyone."

In 1997, Wojnowski's memory of molestation was revived by newspaper accounts of Rudolph Kos, an abusive priest from Texas, sentenced to life in prison and whose victims were awarded $119 million in damages. The case and damage award got him thinking. He spoke to a priest in Maryland who helped him get church-paid therapy and advised him to seek financial compensation through the Archdiocese of Washington. According to Wojnowski, after some correspondence and long delays, the archdiocese informed him that the Italian priest was dead and that there would be no compensation. In April 1998 he took early retirement and began his daily protest outside the Vatican embassy.

Since thousands of commuters pass the traffic signal at the Vatican embassy each day, Wojnowski's protest is familiar to many Washington, D.C. and Maryland residents. The initial reaction to Wojnowski was generally hostile, with passing motorists yelling curses and some even physically threatening him. He reports that at one point his sign was ripped from his hands, thrown in the back of a pickup truck and stolen. However, media focus on the Catholic Church sexual abuse cases has sometimes led to a more supportive reaction. As of August 2018, Wojnowski appears daily outside the Vatican embassy with his sign.

== See also ==
- Nunciature of the Holy See in Washington DC
