= Bradley Willman =

Canadian anti-pedophile activist (born 1980)

- Born: 1980 (age 44–45); Langley, British Columbia
- Occupation: Private investigator

Bradley Willman (born 1980) is an anti-pedophile activist from Canada who engaged in private investigations using the Internet to expose pedophiles. At one time, he had unfettered access to between 2,000 and 3,000 computers that had been used to visit websites of interest to pedophiles as the result of his use of a Trojan horse. Willman's actions helped put California Superior Court judge Ronald Kline in prison for more than two years in 2007 for possession of child pornography. However, the legality of Willman's use of the Trojan horse was a basis for appeal by the judge.

== Biography ==
=== Early life ===
Willman was born in 1980 in Langley, British Columbia, Canada.

=== Private investigator ===
Willman identifies himself as a "private computer cop" and previously used the aliases "Garbie" and "Omnipotent." In the late 1990s, Willman began tracking and investigating people who downloaded child porn from the Internet. At some time before 2000, Willman devised a Trojan horse, a type of computer program, that he used to conduct his investigations.

The Trojan horse was posted to websites of interest to pedophiles in a way that it appeared to be a picture-file attached to a message, but was actually a program file. When a visitor to the pedophile website downloaded the file, the visitor unwittingly downloaded the Trojan horse, and would typically be unaware that it was running on his or her computer. Willman had no control over who chose to download the Trojan horse. Once it had been downloaded, Willman could access, search, and retrieve files from the infected computer. Willman stated "My whole intent, after the program started working as I expected it to, was to help kids." Willman estimated that his Trojan Horse gave him access to between 2,000 and 3,000 computers that had been used to visit websites of interest to pedophiles, including those of police officers, military personnel, social workers, priests, and judges.

=== Pre-Kline investigations ===
In March 2000, Willman helped the Royal Canadian Mounted Police with a child molestation case. Some time after August 2000, Willman anonymously provided to a private watchdog group documents related to a Kentucky state investigation of child molestation and production of child pornography. Prior to January 2001, the United States Customs Service contacted Willman to see whether he had discovered any useful information related to a suspected Russian child pornography ring.

== United States v. Kline ==
In early May 2000, California Superior Court Judge Ronald C. Kline (1941–) downloaded the Trojan horse to his computer. The Trojan Horse allowed Willman, who was in British Columbia, to monitor the contents of Kline's computer in California. Between May 2000 and mid-April 2001, Willman copied portions of Kline's diary from Kline's computer.

In April 2001, Willman anonymously forwarded excerpts of a diary on Kline's hard drives with a final entry dated March 18, 2001 to the website of pedophile-watchdog PedoWatch. PedoWatch passed the diary on to the San Bernardino County Sheriff's Office, which forwarded it to the California Attorney General's office, which in turn sent it on to the City of Irvine Police Department.

=== The search ===
In November 2001, Irvine police searched Kline's Irvine home and found more than 1,500 pornographic computer images of young children on the judge's home computer. Child porn also was found on Kline's courthouse computer. This event drew national attention and ultimately led Kline to drop his bid for reelection as judge, largely as a result of efforts by talk radio hosts John and Ken of KFI-AM (640).

After Kline was charged in November 2001 by the United States Federal Government with possession of child pornography, a man who said the judge had molested him when he was a 14 years old a quarter-century earlier came forward and California state child molestation charges were filed against Kline as well. The state child molestation charges were dismissed in July 2003 after the legal case Stogner v. California, 539 U.S. 607 (2003) held that a California extension of the statute of limitations for sex-related child abuse could not be applied to previously time-barred prosecutions.

=== Legal proceedings ===
In the United States, evidence that derives from an illegal government search generally cannot be used in court against a defendant by the government. However, evidence that derives from an illegal private search such as from a citizen tipster may be used in court by the government, even though the search was illegal. When an individual does the illegal search, a court answers the private/government search question by determining whether the individual was an "instrument or agent" of the government. If "the government knew of and acquiesced in the intrusive conduct, and ... the party performing the search intended to assist law enforcement efforts," then the party performing the illegal search is considered an agent of the government.

On March 17, 2003, a federal judge ruled that Willman was working as a government informant when he invaded Judge Kline's computers because (i) Willman thought of himself as an agent for law enforcement and (ii) Willman's motivation for the invasion was to act for law enforcement purposes. Since the judge ruled that this violated Kline's United States 4th Amendment right to privacy against illegal searches by the government, the judge suppressed some of the prosecution's strongest evidence against Kline. Specifically, the judge suppressed all evidence seized from Kline's home and his home computer, including excerpts from a computer diary about his sexual desires and more than 1,500 pornographic photos of young boys.

On appeal to the United States Court of Appeals for the Ninth Circuit, the appeals court disagreed with the federal judge and found that it was not enough for Willman to act with the intent to assist the government. There needed to have been some degree of governmental knowledge and acquiescence in Willman's actions to find that Willman was acting as a government agent. Thus, the appeals court reversed the district court's order suppressing the evidence that was found as the fruit of Willman's illegal, but private, search. In March 2005, the United States Supreme Court declined to hear the case, which ended Kline's appeals.

=== The admission ===
With the 9th Circuit and United States Supreme Court actions, Willman's evidence was now back in play. In December 2005, former Orange County Superior Court Judge Ronald C. Kline pleaded guilty to possessing child pornography on his home computer, ending a four-year legal battle during which Kline was under house arrest. A trial conviction could have brought Kline a 30-year prison term, but a plea agreement limited prison time to a possible 27 to 33 months.

In June 2006, the state Commission on Judicial Performance gave Kline the most serious punishment it could give a former judge by barring him from receiving work from state courts.

In February 2007, Kline was sentenced to 27 months in prison for possessing child pornography.

== See also ==
- Internet crime
- Online predator
- To Catch a Predator
