= Alex Rosen =

American anti-pedophile activist

- Other names: Chet Goldstein, Gordon Flowers
- Years active: 2019–present
- Organization: Predator Poachers

Alex Levi Rosen (also known under his online aliases Chet Goldstein and Gordon Flowers) is the founder of the Houston-based organization Predator Poachers, which conducts sting operations on adults who seek sexual activities with minors.

Rosen founded the organization in 2019. As of October 2025, the organization has claimed responsibility for arrests in all 50 U.S. states and convictions in 41, though this statistic has not been fully verified.

== Career ==
Rosen founded Predator Poachers at the age of 19 in his hometown of Houston. The operations conducted by the group generally follow the strategy of using a dating app to create a profile under a false identity, waiting for an adult to message the account and then quickly disclosing that the account in question belongs to an underage person. If the target continues to message the account, the chat is then usually followed by a real-life meeting with the suspect. Rosen stated in an interview with Fox 40: "We drop our age immediately. We don't give them any doubts as to how old we are". The organization is funded by membership subscriptions and merchandise sales on its website.

Most of Predator Poachers' operations used to take place on Grindr, an LGBT online dating application. Grindr became closely associated with Predator Poachers' brand on its YouTube channel, whose banner featured an illustration of a smartphone displaying a Grindr conversation. In an interview with The Verge, Rosen stated that the reason why they use Grindr is because he "didn't have pictures of underage girls on my phone", he told the organization. "I do have a little brother though, and I did have pictures of him on my phone." Rosen told Business Insider that, in a 2021 operation, he had used his 16-year-old cousin as a decoy, adding that he agreed that "it was very irresponsible". A 2020 article by Cincinnati CityBeat stated that in many videos Rosen seemed "to instigate fights, or use excessive profanity and derogatory terms", and that the language he had used on video resulted in his YouTube channel receiving two strikes. The channel was later banned from the platform due to receiving multiple community guidelines strikes.

In 2021, the group was responsible for exposing comedian and content creator Bryant Moreland, more commonly known by his online alias EDP445 (standing for "Eat Dat Pussy" and the "445" a referencing his weight number when he created his account), for allegedly talking to one of their decoys. The group was permanently banned from YouTube after the event due to policy violations. Another channel Rosen created on the platform was deleted in 2021.

When asked about the opinion of law enforcement officials who say that such matter should be left to police departments, Rosen said that "every single department is either going to say nothing or discourage it publicly, but we've seen that departments that discourage it publicly will work to prosecute our cases". Upon being interviewed by the St. Louis Post-Dispatch about the topic in 2019, some law enforcement officers stated that the phenomenon of predator hunters can create a new form of mob justice and engineer chaotic situations that should be left to professionals.

=== Incidents ===
On July 24, 2024, Rosen stated that a 60-year-old man had died by suicide after Rosen and his team accused him of viewing child pornography. According to court documents, Donald Anthony Letcher had been previously accused of child molestation in the 1990s in a criminal case that was ultimately dismissed by the prosecution after the South Dakota Supreme Court overturned his conviction due to concerns regarding the credibility of the witnesses and another evidence-related issue that, the court stated, "severely prejudiced [his] ability to defend" himself. Rosen and his team were detained by police during the incident.

On March 26, 2025, Rosen was arrested in Branson, Missouri by the Branson Police Department for felony harassment at a Steak n' Shake restaurant after attempting to confront an alleged child predator named Joshua Teague who worked there.

Investigators said that someone with Rosen's organization posed as a 13-year-old and messaged Teague, and that "Teague admitted to requesting nude photos from someone he thought was the teenager."

== Political positions ==
Rosen has described himself as "very, very right-wing", as a libertarian and as a conservative. His account on X has 475,000 followers.

=== Confrontation with Peter Hotez ===
In June 2023, Rosen confronted pediatrician and vaccine advocate Peter Hotez at the latter's home in Houston. The visit happened after Hotez declined to debate presidential candidate and anti-vaccine activist Robert F. Kennedy Jr. on the Joe Rogan Experience podcast. During the encounter, which happened at the sidewalk of Hotez's home, Rosen asked Hotez why he had refused to debate Kennedy and whether he believed in vaccine injuries. Hotez responded by saying he was still considering debating Kennedy and said "don't come to my house" before going back inside. Later that day, Hotez claimed via social media that he had been "stalked in front of my home by a couple of antivaxers taunting me to debate RFK Jr."

=== Statements about LGBT people ===
According to Texas Observer reporter Steven Monacelli, Rosen has described the LGBT community as a "cult".

In a social media post published prior to March 2020, Rosen called on his followers to campaign against a scheduled drag queen story hour event at an Idaho library, stating: "I don't think that shit needs to be around kids, because kids are kids. They can't decide what their preferences are at that young age".

=== Use of racial slurs ===
Rosen has been recorded using racist epithets in videos. In 2019, Rosen used a racial slur on video, an event that he later confirmed in a 2023 interview with the Evansville Courier & Press. In the interview, in which the news organization asked him about his previous use of racial slurs, Rosen stated that he is Jewish and that "I said it, but I'm not apologizing for it. Because, you know, people say that word has power. I mean, I don't think making Holocaust or Jew jokes has any power".

Rosen has said the racial slur nigger in multiple YouTube videos and livestreams. In a prank call to a Black Lives Matter hotline, he reportedly used homophobic and racial slurs. Rosen stated in an interview that "it obviously looks bad" and that he had "no hatred in my heart towards any group of people".

=== Mock petition against H-1B visas ===
Amid an early 2025 anti-immigration backlash against Indian H-1B workers in the United States, Rosen published a video on X in which he visited Indian-owned shops and urged ethnic Indians to sign a mock petition to stop "the spread of the H-1B virus." Rosen stated on social media that the metaphorical virus "originated from India" and its "symptoms" included "smell" and "diarrhea", adding that it was the "deadliest virus" in the country. The video garnered over a million views and was described as racist by many users on the platform.

=== Activism at public events ===
In June 2022, Rosen published a video of himself confronting Republican representative Dan Crenshaw at the Texas State Republican Convention, calling him a "World Economic Forum sell-out", until being stopped by security. In October of the same year, Rosen posted a video where Harris County officers told him that he had been banned from the Harris County Commissioners Court for being "disruptive".

In October 2023, Rosen heckled Hillary Clinton at a Houston political rally and accused her husband, Bill Clinton, of having visited Jeffrey Epstein's island "26 times". He was subsequently dragged out of the event by security.

=== Support for Chud the Builder ===
Rosen is an outspoken supporter of controversial livestreamer Dalton Eatherly better known as Chud the Builder. Eatherly gained notoriety for posting derogatory ragebait content in which he antagonized random Black people with racial slurs and threats of violence unprovoked. On May 13, 2026, Dalton was arrested for attempted murder of a Black man named Joshua Fox stemming from an incident outside of Montgomery County Courthouse in Tennessee. Rosen made an appearance at Eatherly's court hearing where he took to the witness stand and presented bank records as well as Cash App documents to the court; and told them that he was willing to put US$100,000 towards Eatherly's bond. Rosen later publicly donated $10,000 towards Eatherly's bail, claiming that it was because he supports free speech.

The incident led JiDion to end his partnership with Rosen, a decision that he announced publicly on June 4 in a YouTube video titled "This Is the End". In the video he explained that he could no longer continue working with Rosen after finding out that he donated money towards Eatherly's bond and argued, "That money could have gone toward catching predators, cancer research, helping homeless people, or doing something positive".

== See also ==
- Alex Stein
- Anti-pedophile activism
- Anti-vaccine activism
- To Catch a Predator
