= Dads Against Predators =

American vigilante group

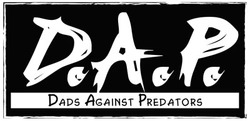
- Abbreviation: DAP
- Formation: 2020
- Founder: Joshua Mundy and Jay Cameron Carnicom
- Headquarters: Ohio
- Region served: United States

Dads Against Predators (DAP) is an American vigilante group led by Joshua Mundy and Jay Cameron Carnicom. The group was founded in 2020 and is based in the state of Ohio, although they have operated in several states. Its operations have been described by police as often culminating in physical violence, for which reason the group had been banned from multiple Ohio stores.

A public statement signed by Sandusky County's sheriff, the county prosecutor, and other Ohio police chiefs in October 2020 stated that DAP "fails to potentially realize that it is creating seriously hazardous and potentially dangerous situations in community settings" and that the group's "careless and reckless regard for law and order and due process has resulted in the loss of life". In 2022, three members of Dads Against Predators, including Carnicom and Mundy, were charged after one of the group's operations culminated in a shooting at a shopping mall in North Carolina.

== History ==
Dads Against Predators was founded in Ohio in 2020 by Joshua Mundy and Jay Carnicom, both of whom pose as minors on the Internet for the purpose of luring people who believe they are sexting minors into filmed, real-life confrontations. As of 2021, the group was publishing recordings of its confrontations on Patreon and YouTube, as well as Locals.

In October 2020, the Sandusky County Sheriff's Office and Fremont Police Department threatened to press charges against Dads Against Predators, stating that the group's "careless and reckless regard for law and order and due process has resulted in the loss of life, and the situation has gotten out of hand". One of the group's leaders, Joshua Mundy, denied that the organization had engaged in any illegal activity. As of 2021, the group was alleged to have been tied to the suicides of three people that it had accused of sexual misconduct. The leaders of the organization denied having any responsibility for the incidents.

A video published on social media in 2024 showed a member of Dads Against Predators accusing a man of attempting to meet a 13-year-old girl in a Lubbock branch of Kohl's while holding a picture of him in public, after which the man was physically assaulted. According to police, the victim sustained multiple injuries in the face, which led to a swollen right eye and a bleeding nose. Lubbock Police Department Lieutenant Brady Cross discouraged the actions of the group and stated that when "you meet someone in a place to take some kind of enforcement action that may not be within your rights, and if you resort to just hitting and assaulting them, you yourself will be in the wrong at that point."

In October 2024, three California men associated with Dads Against Predators were charged with false imprisonment by violence and felony assault. According to police, the men had physically assaulted a man who they had accused of sexual misconduct. Later that month, five other members of the group were charged with organized criminal activity in Lakeway, Texas. According to the Lakeway Police Department, the DAP members had filmed themselves physically assaulting a person they had accused of sexual misconduct for about five minutes.

=== Death of Robert Lee ===
On September 29, 2023, Dads Against Predators member Robert Lee, known as "Boopac Shakur", was fatally shot when confronted by two teenagers in a restaurant in Pontiac, Michigan. The 40-year-old man died in the hospital the day after the encounter. According to Oakland County Sheriff Michael Bouchard, as of October 2023, no evidence had been found that the shooting was related to a vigilante sting, despite initial reports.

According to police, on two different occasions prior to his death, Lee had been charged for destroying property of people who were not targets of his sting operations, and in one instance he had accused an innocent person of being a sexual predator. A CNN article described some videos published by Lee on social media as appearing to show him "engaging in violent confrontations with alleged predators". In one video, Lee flattened a person's tires to prevent them from driving away. Lee began conducting sting operations after working with DAP in 2020; he was involved in a sting operation with other DAP vigilantes prior to the shooting in March 2023. Lee cited Dads Against Predators, as well as the television series To Catch a Predator, as inspiration for his operations.

At the time of the shooting, the 16-year-old who fired at Lee was facing a charge of assault with intent to murder related to another shooting that took place in the same city on September 20.

=== 2022 Hanes Mall Boulevard shooting ===
On June 28, 2022, three members of Dads Against Predators were involved in a shooting at a Target store on Hanes Mall Boulevard, a shopping mall located in Winston-Salem, North Carolina. The alleged predator had proposed meeting at an abandoned quarry in the woods, but was convinced to meet at Target instead. According to police, three members of DAP lured a man to the Target store using a social media account, the target noticed a camera and lunged for it, causing the camera to drop, after which one vigilante assaulted the target. The target, who brought a gun with them to meet the underage girl, and a fight ensued, during which he shot one of the group's leaders, Carnicom, in the leg. The target of the vigilante group subsequently drove to a local hospital, where he was treated for minor head injuries.

In January 2023, the Winston-Salem Police Department issued an arrest warrant for each of the three vigilantes associated with the shooting. It also charged the man they had lured for carrying a concealed gun. The assistant chief of the Fremont Police Department stated that he was not surprised by the shooting because, he said, the organization had been banned from several Ohio stores due to their meet-ups often culminating in violence.

=== Jay Carnicom 2026 assault allegations ===
Jay Carnicom was charged by Clay County, Florida authorities in 2026 after a confrontation with an alleged predator turned violent. Police stated that Carnicom used excessive force during the incident, which included assaulting the individual and forcing them to eat cigarette butts.
