= Stinson Hunter =

British vigilante

Stinson Hunter (born Kieren Ashby/ Parsons, 10 October 1981) is a British vigilante who is best known for being the subject of the documentary The Paedophile Hunter. The film investigating child sexual exploitation was named "Best Documentary on a Contemporary Theme" in the 42nd British Documentary Awards, which "celebrates documentaries from Britain and abroad that "have made a significant contribution to the genre."

The Guardian published an article referencing the film, and reporting the estimated 10 active paedophile hunting groups in the UK. "While the police are critical of such groups in public, they privately provide advice and support on how to conduct stings. 'The police are like us. They’re human beings,' a member of a group said. 'They have families, so they understand what we’re doing and why we’re doing it.'”

Hunter's personal challenges, such as past issues with alcohol, drugs, stalking and a prison term for arson have been reported in editorial newspapers as well as tabloid newspapers. In a 2013 sting he confronted Michael Parkes over allegations, Mr Parkes was subsequently arrested and freed by the police. Due to the incident Mr Parkes took his own life.

In January 2025, Ashby was convicted of stalking a woman online.

He appeared at Hamilton Sheriff Court and admitted to conducting a stalking campaign that caused the Lanarkshire-based journalist fear and alarm in January 2023. Ashby requested that his 500,000 followers harass and send hate filled posts to an unnamed Scottish journalist who he falsely accused of leaking personal information, publicly accusing her of backing paedophiles".

He was placed under social work supervision for 12 months and said he must attend mental health services as directed. He was confined to his home between 7pm and 7am each day under an eight-month electronic tagging order. The sheriff also imposed a non-harassment order, banning Ashby from any contact with the journalist for five years.

Hunter has not undertaken any recent sting operations with no further updates on any cases.
