= Dzhendem tepe =

Highest hill of Plovdiv, Bulgaria

- Youth Hill, Hill of Youth, Mount of the Dryad Nymphs, Dzhin Tepe, Chigdem Tepe
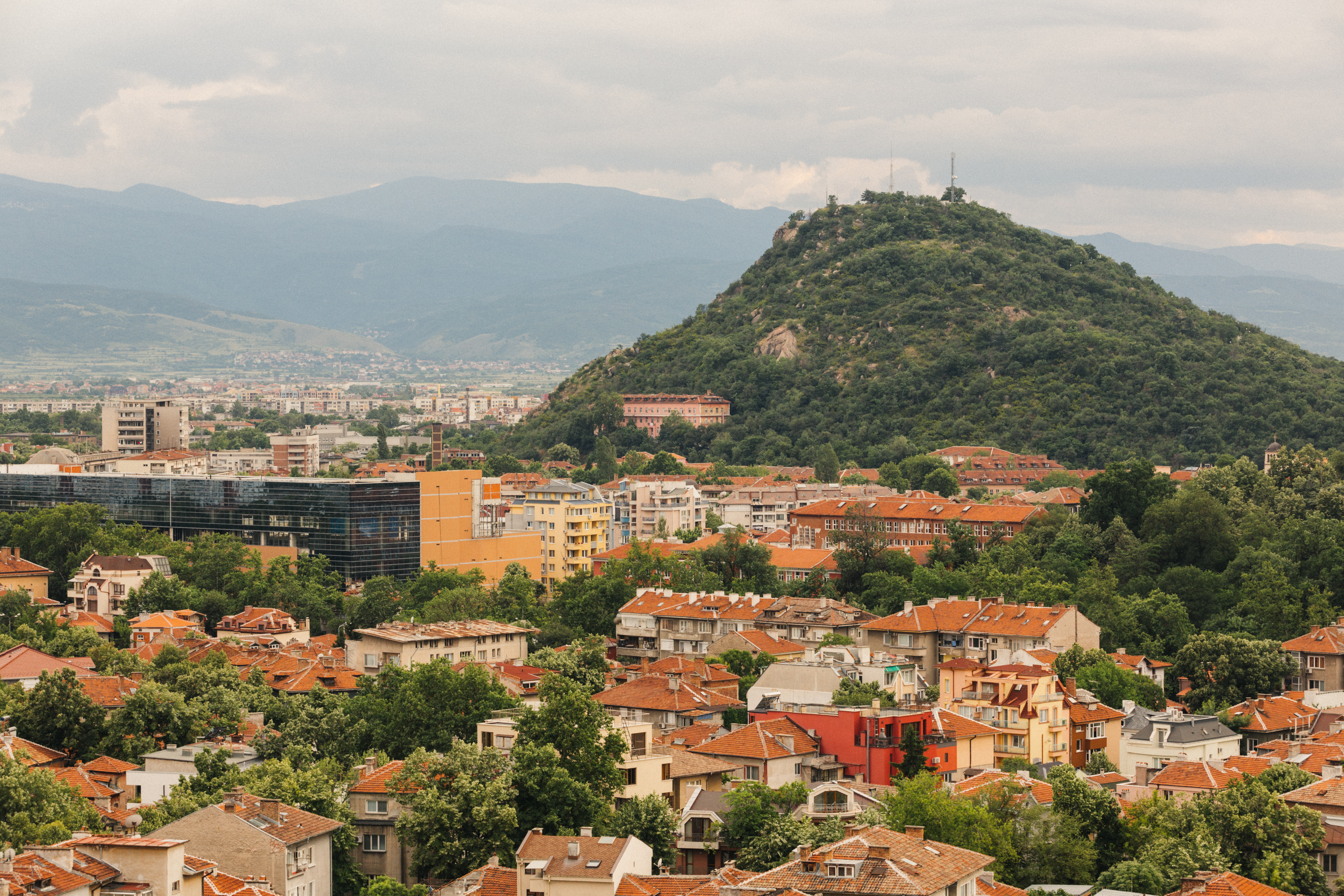
- View of Dzhendem hill and Markovo Tepe Mall in Plovdiv

Highest point
- Elevation: 300 m (980 ft)
- Coordinates: 42°08′13″N 24°43′55″E

Geography
- Location: Plovdiv
- Country: Bulgaria
- Settlement: Plovdiv

Dzhendem tepe (also called Youth Hill or Hill of (the) Youth) is the biggest and highest of the seven hills of Plovdiv, Bulgaria. It is located in the western part of town. Its approximate height (above sea-level) is 300 metres (980 ft). The hill has been declared a natural landmark.

== History ==
In ancient times, it was called the Mount of the Dryad Nymphs. During the Bronze Age there was a settlement and/or a shrine on its top. There are reports that a huge bronze statue of the god Apollo stood on top of the hill until late antiquity. In Roman times the main city temple, dedicated to Apollo Cendrisseos, was located there, which was turned into a large three-nave basilica in the 4th century. During the Ottoman period it was called Dzhin Tepe (hill of the spirits), which gradually changed to Djendem Tepe. It also called Chigdem Tepe (hill of the crocus).

The other name of the hill, Youth Hill, derives from the fact that young labourers worked on paving the road up the hill (the road is made out of concrete cubes pavement) during the communist era (1944–1989). They also built a now-disused pool on top of the hill.

== Infrastructure ==
Nowadays, there is a meteorological basecamp on top of the hill as well as a large radio/TV/mobile-operator base antennas cell tower complex.

The lowest part of the Youth Hill is one of the best parks in Plovdiv (along with the Central Park) and features a drinking-water fountain. It even sports a children's train which functions since the communist era. The road up the hill has been fitted with street-lighting and is usually accessible even for cars when a trespassing barrier is lifted.
