= Mikaela Beardsley =

American film producer (born 1970)

Mikaela Beardsley (born January 22, 1970) is an American documentary film producer and entrepreneur. She is currently the executive director of the What Works Media Project. Most of her films are distributed by PBS or HBO Documentary Films.

== Biography ==
Beardsley was born in Boston, MA. In 1992, she graduated magna cum laude from Princeton University, where she earned her BA in Comparative Literature. At Princeton, she was classmates with future screenwriter Craig Mazin and future U.S. Senator Ted Cruz, as well a roommate of film producer and later collaborator, Jamie Gordon. She has produced over a dozen nationally broadcast films, and has worked with the likes of Martin Scorsese, Alex Gibney, and Wim Wenders, among others.

== Career ==
In 1993, Beardsley began her career at WGBH-TV in Boston, Massachusetts. She then moved to New York, where she acted as an associate producer on The Irish in America: Long Journey Home.

In 2003, PBS presented a seven-part documentary film series from Martin Scorsese called, Martin Scorsese Presents: The Blues, dedicated to exploring the history of the uniquely American musical genre. Beardsley served as a producer on episodes directed by Scorsese, Clint Eastwood, Charles Burnett and Wim Wenders.

In 2009, Beardsley produced the documentary film Reporter, about New York Times columnist Nicholas D. Kristof's work in the Democratic Republic of Congo. The film was directed by Eric Daniel Metzgar, and executive produced by Ben Affleck. The film premiered at the 2009 Sundance Film Festival, before first airing on HBO on February 18, 2010. In 2011, Beardsley would receive an Emmy nomination for Outstanding Informational Programming - Longform for Reporter.

Beardsley originated the Half the Sky movement, a multi-year global media project aimed at improving opportunity for women and girls in the developing world, based on the critically acclaimed nonfiction book, by Kristof and Sheryl WuDunn. This included a four-hour documentary in 2012 that Beardsley executive produced, which PBS aired in two parts on consecutive nights. The documentary featured celebrity advocates America Ferrera, Diane Lane, Eva Mendes, Meg Ryan, Gabrielle Union, and Olivia Wilde traveling to developing countries. In November of that year, Beardsley served as the keynote speaker at the first annual Global Solutions Forum at Vail Mountain School, discussing the project. For Half the Sky, Beardlsey developed a partnership with USAID, that linked the Ford Foundation, IKEA Foundation, Intel and numerous other corporate partners, including Coca-Cola, Goldman Sachs, Bill & Melinda Gates Foundation, John D. and Catherine T. MacArthur Foundation, Nike, and the Rockefeller Foundation, raising five million dollars for direct programs.

In 2015, Beardley received her second Emmy nomination, this time for Outstanding Historical Programming, for producing Makers: Women Who Make America.

In 2016, Mikaela initiated the What Works Media Project, joining with Results For America, Soledad O'Brien's Starfish Media Group, The Sorenson Impact Center, and Impact Partners. The project commissions award-winning documentary directors to produce character-driven shorts focusing on the advancement of social mobility, and the government officials leading the way. First announced at the 2016 Sundance Film Festival, the films are scheduled to go into production in late 2017.

== Filmography ==
=== Producer ===
- Beatles '64 (co-producer)
- Makers: Women Who Make America (2014) (Producer - 2 Episodes)
- The 50 Year Argument (2014) (Supervising Producer)
- Half The Sky (2012) (Executive Producer)
- Independent Lens (2012) (Executive Producer - 1 Episodes)
- Meena (2011) (Producer)
- Woinshet (2009) (Producer)
- Reporter (2009) (Producer)
- I Am an Animal: The Story of Ingrid Newkirk and PETA (2007) (Producer)
- Val Lewton: The Man in the Shadows (2007) (Line Producer)
- James Blunt: Return to Kosovo (2007) (Producer) (Also: Camera Operator)
- #1 Single (2006) (Producer - 1 Episode)
- The Blues (2003) (Supervising Producer - 2 Episodes) (Also: Coordinating Producer - 1 Episode, Co-Producer - 1 Episode)
- The Soul of a Man (2003) (Supervising Producer)
- Gladiator Days: Anatomy of a Prison Murder (2002) (Associate Producer)
- The Kennedy Center Presents: Speak Truth to Power (2000) (co-producer)
- Soldiers in the Army of God (2000) (Associate Producer)
- The Irish in America: Long Journey Home (1998) (Series Associate Producer - 3 Episodes) (Also: Associate Producer - 1 Episode)

== Personal life ==
She is married to film producer Cary Woods.
