= Kristof Farms =

Vineyard in Oregon, USA

Coordinates: 45°23′8″N 123°9′12″W

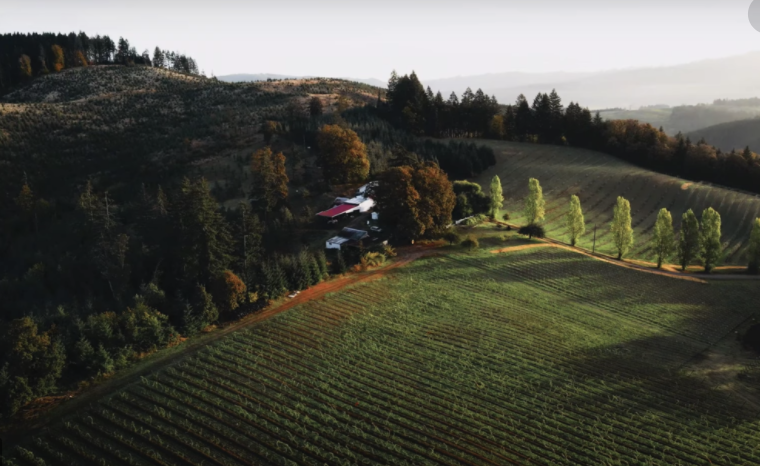
- Kristof Farms Pinot Noir Grapes in Fall 2020
- Interactive map of Kristof Farms
- Town/City: Yamhill County, Oregon
- Established: 1971
- Owner: The Kristof Family
- Area: Willamette Valley
- Produces: Cider apples and Pinot noir grapes

Kristof Farms is an apple orchard and grape vineyard located in Willamette Valley of the United States, near the city of Yamhill, Oregon. The land was first homesteaded in the early 20th century and produced cherries until 2018, at which point the farm was converted to produce cider apples and pinot noir grapes.

The two-time Pulitzer Prize winner Nicholas Kristof was raised on this 73 acre farm, which grew cherries and sheep during his youth, and he attended the local Yamhill-Carlton High School. The farm is situated in the Yamhill-Carlton AVA, which is known for its soil of marine sediments and positioning behind a rain shadow formed by the Oregon Coast Range.

In 2022, the Kristof family harvested their first vintage, including a Chardonnay that topped Wine Spectator's review of Oregon Chardonnays. The farm also includes a block of Pinot Noir with partial shading from Douglas-fir trees that support the higher acidity and lower sugar for a bright Rosé.

Kristof Farms is featured in Nicholas Kristof and Sheryl WuDunn's book Tightrope. The authors attribute their decision to plant high-value crops to research done for the book.

In an interview with local magazine Willamette Week, Kristof said, "Yamhill, in many ways, has done spectacularly well with the arrival of the wine and tourism industry. It truly is a spectacularly thriving and resilient place. America is also thriving and strong and resilient, yet there are a lot of Americans who have been left behind. So, by all means, readers should come to visit Yamhill and drink good Yamhill pinots while also understanding that there's a story beyond the vineyards."

== History ==
The land on which Kristof Farms sits was, for over 8000 years, inhabited by Native tribes such as the Yamhill (also known as the Yamel), a tribe of the Kalapuya family for which the city was now named. Settlers homesteaded the land in the 1930s and planted the first orchards of apples, walnuts, and prunes. In 1950, they planted pie cherries, and for many decades it was a cherry farm.

The Kristofs were an Armenian family living in Eastern Europe. During World War II, family members spied on the Nazis for the Allies, were caught and imprisoned, and eventually had their lands seized. Nicholas Kristof's father, Ladis Kristof, fled to Yugoslavia and was then imprisoned by the Communists in a concentration camp. He was released and made his way to France with the hope of reaching America. In 1952, the First Presbyterian Church in Portland, Oregon, sponsored him, and he arrived that fall and found a job in a logging camp in Valsetz, Oregon.

After learning English, Ladis Kristof became a distinguished political scientist at Portland State University where his wife, Jane Kristof, taught art history. They bought Kristof Farms and raised a son, Nicholas, who grew up on the farm and went to Yamhill schools. Nicholas married Sheryl WuDunn.

In the early 2010s, Nicholas and Sheryl were writing a book, Tightrope, about the struggles of the working class, and sought to support a higher value-added agriculture in the area. They decided to replace the cherry orchard with Pinot noir grapes and cider apples.
