= Half the Sky movement =

The Half the Sky Movement is inspired by Nicholas Kristof and Sheryl WuDunn's best-selling book Half the Sky: Turning Oppression into Opportunity for Women Worldwide. The movement seeks to put an end to the oppression of women and girls worldwide through a transmedia project that uses video, websites, games, blogs and other educational tools both to raise awareness of women's issues and also to provide concrete steps to fight these problems and empower women.

== Television series ==
The Half the Sky movement includes a four-hour television series for PBS that premiered in the United States October 1 and 2, 2012 with international broadcast to follow. Half the Sky Movement follows Nicholas Kristof, Sheryl Wudunn, and A-list celebrity advocates America Ferrera, Diane Lane, Eva Mendes, Meg Ryan, Gabrielle Union, and Olivia Wilde to ten countries: Cambodia, Kenya, India, Sierra Leone, Somaliland, Vietnam, Afghanistan, Pakistan, Liberia and the United States. In each country, the series introduces women and girls living under very difficult circumstances and bravely fighting to challenge them. The show explores the issues of sex trafficking, forced prostitution, maternal mortality, and gender-based violence and proposes how greater education and economic empowerment can help.

== Games ==
Games to accompany the movement are being created by Games for Change.

=== Mobile Games ===
With support from USAID, Games for Change is testing and deploying three mobile games aimed at communities in India and East Africa. Audiences in these countries will be able to explore games such as 9 Minutes (on healthy birthing practices), Worm Attack! (de-worming awareness) and Family Values (highlighting the value of girls in families).

=== Facebook game ===
The Facebook game was released March 4, 2013 and is aimed at increasing awareness and funds for women around the world. Players can explore stories and quests based on the real experiences of women and girls. The game was developed by Frima Studios and executive produced by Games for Change.
