= Hayward (restaurant) =

Restaurant in McMinnville, Oregon, U.S.

- Interactive map of Hayward

Restaurant information
- Established: May 2023
- Chef: Kari Shaughnessy
- Location: 209 North Kutch St., Carlton, Yamhill, Oregon, 97111, United States
- Coordinates: 45°17′41″N 123°10′44″W
- Website: hayward-restaurant.com

Hayward is a restaurant in Carlton, Oregon, led by chef Kari Shaughnessy. The restaurant describes its cuisine as New Northwest Fare—hyper-seasonal, hyper-local cooking with an emphasis on zero-waste practices, drawing on Willamette Valley farmers for what it calls "unexpected yet nostalgic dishes."

== History ==
Hayward began as a space at the Mac Market food hall in McMinnville, Oregon, before growing into a sit-down restaurant. The McMinnville location closed at the end of May 2025, and Hayward reopened that summer in a standalone space in Carlton, in the former Earth & Sea location, about 15 minutes from McMinnville. Shaughnessy said the move let the restaurant "graduate from the 'incubator' space" of the shared food-hall kitchen into its own space, with more capacity and full design control."

The Carlton location includes a 10-seat bar, a 50-seat dining room, a 20-person covered patio, basement storage for ferments and cheese, and expanded walk-in coolers for whole-animal butchery. The interior design, led by Danridge Geiger, was built around a 1970s theme and the personification of "a very independent woman, a worldly traveler who lives on a farm in Oregon."

== Chef ==
Kari Shaughnessy is a Massachusetts native who began working in food service at age 14. She moved to San Francisco at 21 and worked at Frances under chef Melissa Perello, at the Michelin-starred Sons & Daughters, and at Marla Bakery, where she learned vegetable preparation and whole-animal butchery. She later took time away from restaurant work to help her father with cattle ranching in Maine, then worked at Eventide in Portland, Maine. She moved to Oregon and opened Mac Market in McMinnville in 2020.

== Lucky Duck ==
In July 2026, Shaughnessy opened Lucky Duck, a retail shop, cafe, and guest house in downtown Carlton, in a restored century-old bank building on West Main Street. It is a partnership between Shaughnessy, Jimmy Serlin (owner of Revel Meat Company), and Jules Bandy (Hayward's hospitality director), operating together as Hands Please Hospitality. Lucky Duck is their first project. The shop offers espresso and pastries baked each morning in Hayward's kitchen, sandwiches and lunch items, a wine bar curated by Bandy, and meats supplied by Revel Meat Co., alongside curated retail items such as cookware, books, ceramics, and pantry items. The building preserves its original bank vault, has a brick-lined patio with an outdoor kitchen with rotating chef residencies, and includes a second-floor vacation rental called The Apartment at Lucky Duck.

== Recognition ==
Hayward was a semifinalist for the James Beard Foundation Award for Best New Restaurant in 2024. Shaughnessy was a semifinalist for the James Beard Foundation's Best Chef: Northwest and Pacific award in 2025. The restaurant was named to USA Today's "2025 Restaurants of the Year" list. Travel + Leisure featured Hayward and Shaughnessy in coverage of the Willamette Valley and it has also been featured in Wine Enthusiast, Sunset, and Vogue. Eater Portland has included Hayward among recommended stops for its "ambitious cooking," and Portland Monthly has covered the restaurant's opening, relocation, and cuisine in multiple pieces, including naming Shaughnessy one of the Willamette Valley's best chefs.
