= General Thayer =

General Thayer may refer to:

- James B. Thayer (1922–2018), U.S. Army brigadier general
- John Milton Thayer (1820–1906), Union Army brigadier general and brevet major general
- Simeon Thayer (1737–1800), Rhode Island Militia brigadier general
- Sylvanus Thayer (1785–1872), Union Army brevet brigadier general
