= Yamhill Carlton School District =

School district in Oregon, United States

Yamhill Carlton School District is a school district headquartered in Yamhill, Oregon.

== Schools ==
- Yamhill Carlton High School (YCHS) (Yamhill)
- Yamhill Carlton Intermediate School (YCIS) (Yamhill)
- Yamhill Carlton Elementary School (YCES) (Carlton)
