= China Wakes =

1994 non-fiction book by Nicholas D. Kristof and Sheryl WuDunn

China Wakes: The Struggle for the Soul of a Rising Power
- Author: Nicholas D. Kristof & Sheryl WuDunn
- Language: English
- Genre: Chinese History, Chinese Culture
- Publisher: Random House
- Publication date: 1994
- Publication place: United States
- Media type: Print

China Wakes: The Struggle for the Soul of a Rising Power is a 1994 book by husband-and-wife Nicholas D. Kristof and Sheryl WuDunn, based on their tour in China as reporters for The New York Times. They were awarded the Pulitzer Prize for their reporting.

== Summary ==
In this book, Kristof and WuDunn, husband and wife, wrote about their experiences in China from 1988 to 1993. The couple spent five years in China as journalists reporting for The New York Times. For a time, WuDunn worked and traveled around China as a tourist after her press credentials had been revoked by the Chinese Foreign Ministry on a technicality.

The authors present alternating chapters with Kristof writing the odd-numbered chapters and WuDunn writing the even-numbered chapters. Only the last chapter of the book was written by both authors. Kristoff and WuDunn cover various topics such as the lives of Chinese peasants, corruption, sex, religion, the one-child policy, the Tiananmen Square protests of 1989 (Democracy movement and government crackdown), and the future of the Communist party. The two journalists are assisted by local Chinese friends, anonymous sources, and Communist officials in researching stories for The New York Times. In the Author's Note it is stated that the names of some Chinese sources have been changed for their protection, while the names of corrupt Communist officials have been left uncensored. The authors' view of China is that of a country torn between Deng Xiaoping's successful economic strategy and frustrated political reform and human rights.

== Reception ==
Matei P. Mihalca writing in China Review International praised the book as "well-written, though relatively standard, survey," which, "after an excellent introductory essay," settles on "investigating familiar topics."

Ian Buruma's review in The New York Times noted that the authors did not attempt to predict China's future. "Instead," he says, "they tell us what they saw, and thought," and "what they saw, is, on the whole, more interesting than what they thought. The merit of their book lies in the anecdotes, in the descriptions of various people the authors met and got to know."
