= James B. Thayer =

United States Army general (1922–2018)

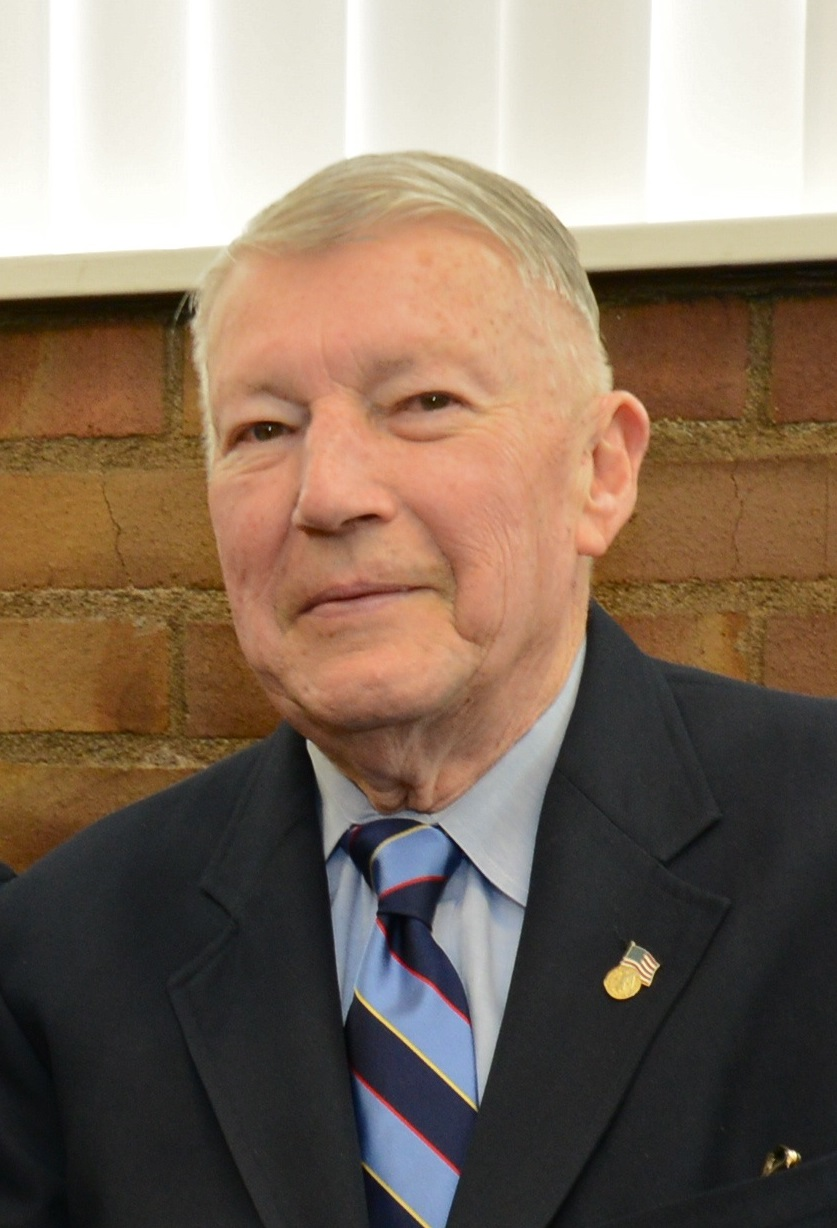
- Brigadier General James B. Thayer, 2012
- Born: James Burdette Thayer; March 10, 1922; Portland, Oregon, U.S.
- Died: September 16, 2018 (aged 96); Lake Oswego, Oregon, U.S.
- Spouse: Patricia Cunningham Thayer (m. 1954; died 2014)
- Children: Jim Thayer Jr. Anne Thayer (died February 15, 2007 (aged 49)); John Thayer; Tommy Thayer; Mike Thayer
- Military career
- Allegiance: United States
- Branch: United States Army
- Service years: 1942–1982; 2000
- Rank: Brigadier general
- Unit: 71st Infantry Division
- Commands: Oregon State Defense Force
- Conflicts: World War II
- Awards: Silver Star; Bronze Star; Secretary of Defense Medal for Outstanding Public Service
- Memorials: Oregon Military Museum
- Other work: Businessman and government official

James Burdette Thayer (March 10, 1922 – September 16, 2018) was an American brigadier general who served on active duty during World War II. On May 4, 1945, Thayer and his platoon discovered and liberated 15,000 people held at a concentration camp near Wels, Austria. Following the war, he continued his service in the United States Army Reserve. In his civilian life, Thayer founded a successful business supply company in Beaverton, Oregon. He was later appointed Oregon's civilian aide to the Secretary of the Army and then re-activated as commander of the Oregon State Defense Force. The Oregon Military Museum at Camp Withycombe is named in his honor.

== Early life ==
Thayer was born in Portland, Oregon, on March 10, 1922. He was related to Sylvanus Thayer, who is known as the "Father of West Point". When he was four, his parents divorced and Thayer moved to his grandparents' farm in Carlton, Oregon. He attended Carlton High School, where he was editor of the school newspaper. During his junior year, he participated in the Oregon High School Press Conference and was elected the conference president. He graduated from high school in 1940, earning a journalism scholarship to the University of Oregon for his newspaper work.

After high school, Thayer enrolled in the University of Oregon's journalism school, where he became the advertising manager for the Oregon Daily Emerald, the university's student newspaper. However, the Japanese attack on Pearl Harbor changed the direction of his life.

== World War II ==
In 1942, Thayer left college at the end of his sophomore year and joined the Army. He entered service at the Presidio of Monterey as an infantry private, but was selected for Officer Candidate School shortly after induction. He was trained as a mine platoon leader at Fort Benning, Georgia. He was commissioned a second lieutenant on October 3, 1944, and assigned to a front line anti-tank company in the 71st Infantry Division, which was operating in Normandy at the time.

As a mine platoon commander, Thayer led his unit across France and into Germany. Along the way, he taught soldiers how to clear minefields along the Maginot Line. Thayer was then reassigned as a reconnaissance platoon leader. That unit included 16 men, two half-tracks, and a jeep. In 1945, his platoon engaged German SS troops who were occupying a small Austrian town. In the battle, his platoon killed 31 German soldiers. When reinforcements from his battalion arrived, 800 German soldiers surrendered. For this action, Thayer was awarded a Silver Star.

On May 4, 1945, Thayer's platoon was hunting for German ammunition dumps near Wels, Austria. As they followed a remote forest road, the platoon began to find dead, dying, and emaciated people. At the end of the road, Thayer and his men discovered and liberated the Gunskirchen Lager concentration camp, part of the Mauthausen-Gusen concentration camp complex, saving approximately 15,000 Hungarian Jews as well as several hundred political prisoners from starvation.

During the course of the war, Thayer also earned a Bronze Star for heroism. After the war, he continued his service in the Army Reserve, serving in a unit based in Vancouver, Washington. He retired from the Army Reserve as a colonel in 1982.

== Businessman and civic leader ==
Thayer returned to the University of Oregon after the war, graduating in 1947 with a Bachelor of Science degree in economics. In 1954, Thayer married Patricia Cunningham, a teacher from Seattle. They settled on a 5-acre (2.0 ha) farm in Beaverton, where they raised five children. A year later, he founded the J. Thayer Company, an office supply business. The firm was also located in Beaverton. Eventually, the company became the largest independent office-supply company in the western United States.

Over the years, Thayer served as president of the Oregon Historical Society, president of the Port of Portland, and president of the Beaverton Chamber of Commerce. He was also chairman of the Tuality Community Hospital board. Thayer was a member of the board of trustees for Reed College and the board of directors for General Telephone and Electric of the Northwest, the Oregon Graduate Institute of Science and Technology, and the Knappton Corporation (now Brix Maritime Company). In addition, he served on the Lewis and Clark Bicentennial Commission.

In 1988, Thayer was serving on the Tuality Community Hospital board of directors. After a nurses' strike and a management shakeup, Thayer agreed to step in and serve as the hospital's interim president. He held the position for five months, until the staff problems were resolved. During that short period, Thayer not only restored harmony to the staff, he also increased the hospital's annual earnings by $4.1 million. In 1991, the flag court at the hospital was named in Thayer's honor.

== Public service ==
In 1989, Thayer was appointed Oregon's civilian aide to the Secretary of the Army. While serving in this position in 1991, he was inducted into the Infantry Hall of Fame in Fort Benning. A year later, he represented the Secretary of Defense at a World War II commemoration ceremony held by the Austrian government. At the ceremony, Thayer was personally recognized for his role in liberating the Gunskirchen Lager concentration camp. When he left the position in 1994, Thayer was awarded the Secretary of Defense Medal for Outstanding Public Service.

In 2000, Thayer was re-activated into military service and promoted to brigadier general. He was then assigned as commander of the Oregon State Defense Force. The Oregon State Defense Force, later renamed the Oregon Civil Defense Force, is one of the three components of the Oregon Military Department, serving as a reserve force for the state militia. The other two components are the Oregon Army National Guard and the Oregon Air National Guard.

== Legacy ==
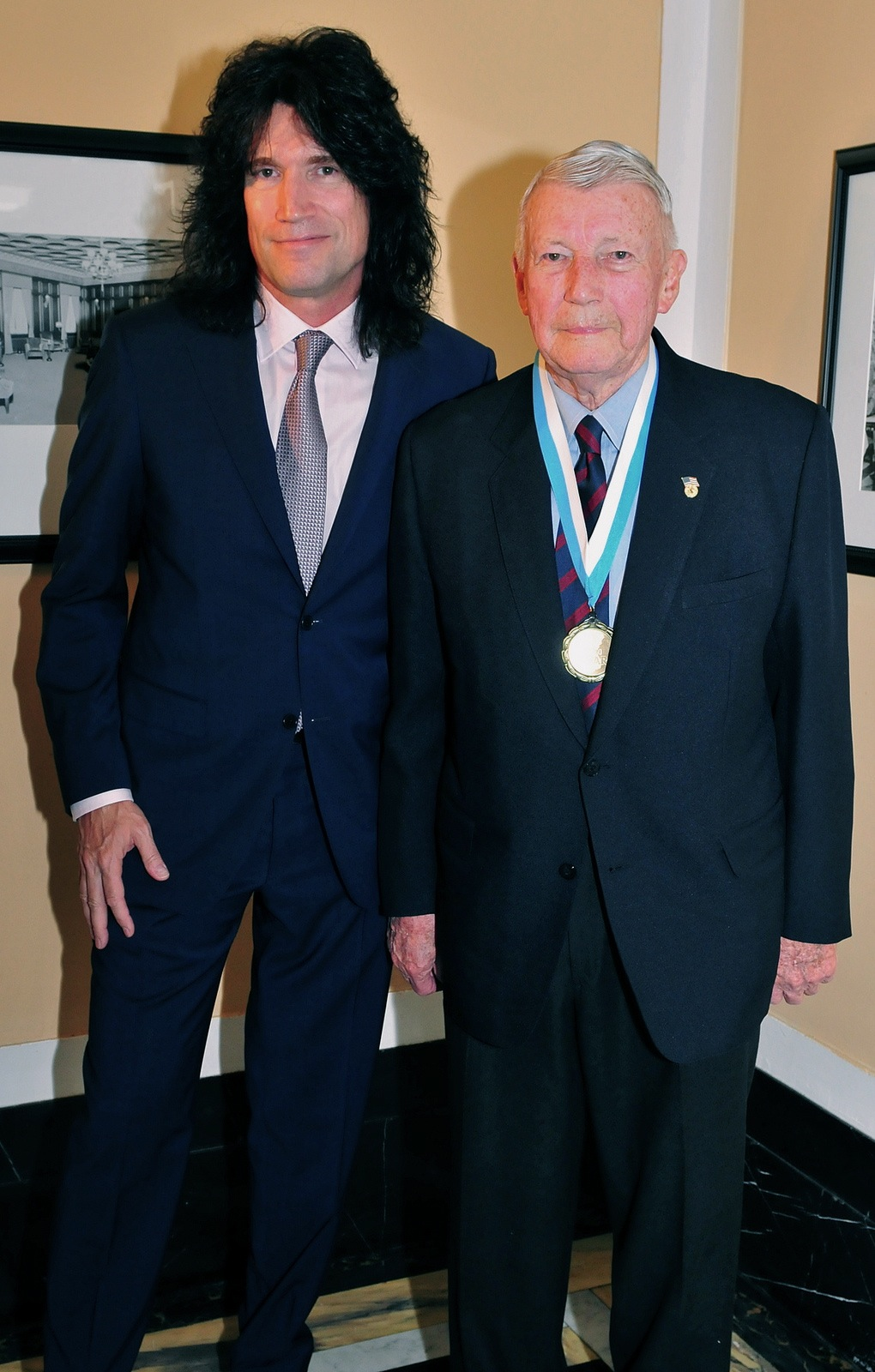
Thayer and his son, Tommy

Thayer was awarded the Grand Decoration of Honor for Services to the Republic of Austria in 1996. The award recognized him for saving thousands of starving people held at the Gunskirchen Lager concentration camp. An oral account of Thayer's experience during the liberation of the Gunskirchen camp is archived at the United States Holocaust Memorial Museum in Washington, District of Columbia. Also in the mid-1990s, Thayer was made an honorary colonel of the 14th Infantry Regiment, an element of the 25th Infantry Division, at Schofield Barracks in Hawaii.

In 2005, Thayer received the University of Oregon Alumni Association Distinguished Alumni Award. Previous recipients of the award include: Nobel Prize winner, Walter Brattain; Nike cofounders, Bill Bowerman and Phil Knight; long-time Congresswoman, Edith Green; film producer, James Ivory; and author, Ken Kesey.

Thayer's son, Tommy Thayer, was the lead guitarist for the rock band Kiss. In 2014 and again in 2017, Kiss gave special performances in the Portland area to raise money for a new 32,000-square-foot (3,000 m^{2}) facility to house the Oregon Military Museum. Both concerts raised over a million dollars for the cause. Thayer's heroism in Austria is captured in a novel, Down a Dark Road by H.R. "Buzz" Bernard.

Thayer died on September 16, 2018, in Lake Oswego, Oregon. His death was announced on the official Kiss website. He was 96.

== Awards and decorations ==
Thayer's United States military and civilian decorations include:

Combat Infantryman Badge

Silver Star Medal
Bronze Star Medal
Secretary of Defense Medal for Outstanding Public Service
Grand Decoration of Honor (Austria)
Oregon National Guard Distinguished Service Medal
Oregon National Guard Exceptional Service Medal
Oregon National Guard Commendation Medal

International awards:

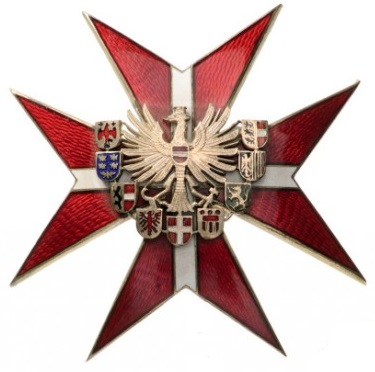
Grand Decoration of Honor for Services to the Republic of Austria
