= Cary Woods =

American film producer

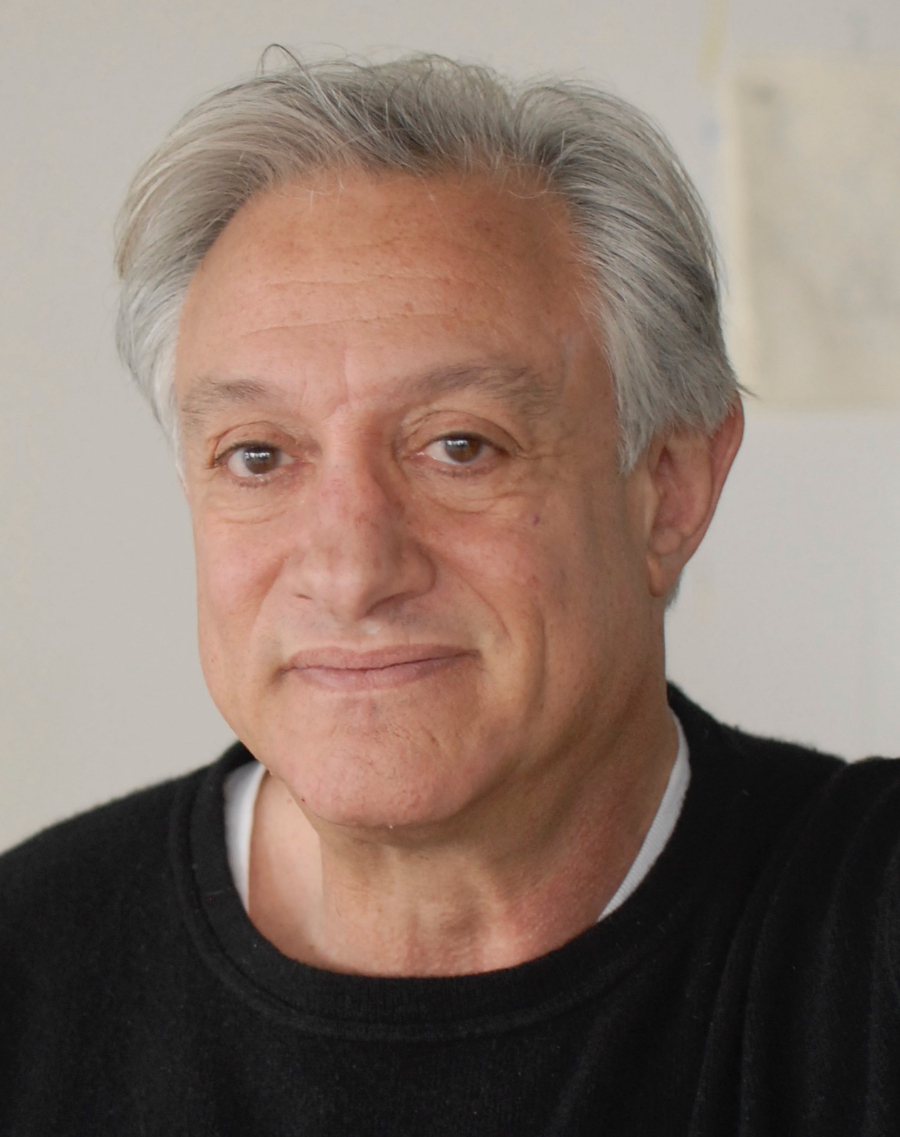
- Woods in 2018
- Born: May 6, 1957 (age 69); The Bronx, New York, U.S.
- Education: USC School of Law
- Occupations: Film Producer, Talent Agent, Executive
- Spouse(s): Emily Cinader Scott (divorced); Mikaela Beardsley
- Children: 1

Cary Woods (born May 6, 1957) is an American film producer. In addition to producing worldwide blockbusters Scream and Godzilla, Woods also produced the directorial debuts (or breakthrough features) of many notable filmmakers, including: Alexander Payne, Larry Clark, Doug Liman, James Mangold, Harmony Korine, and M. Night Shyamalan.

== Early life and education ==
Born and raised in the Bronx, Woods graduated from law school at the University of Southern California and began his career at the William Morris Agency (now part of WME).

== Career ==
At WMA, Woods introduced audiences to Gus Van Sant, Charlie Sheen, Uma Thurman, Matt Dillon, Todd Solondz, Michael Lehmann, Sam Kinison and Sandra Bernhard. Woods shepherded films like Heathers and Drugstore Cowboy before taking a job with Sony Pictures Entertainment.

As Vice President, working for Chairmen Peter Guber and Jon Peters at Sony (the parent company of Columbia Pictures and TriStar Pictures), Woods segued to a production deal to produce So I Married An Axe Murderer, Rudy, Only You, and Threesome, starring Mike Myers, Robert Downey, Jr., Marisa Tomei and Christopher Walken.

In 1995 Woods started Independent Pictures. The release of Larry Clark's Kids marked the beginning of Woods' library of indie filmmaking. Kids, which starred Rosario Dawson and Chloë Sevigny, was a catalyst for Harvey and Bob Weinstein's Miramax Films.

In 1996, Woods was the Executive Producer of Swingers, which helped start the careers of Vince Vaughn, Jon Favreau, and Doug Liman. During the same year, he produced Wes Craven's film, Scream. He also produced Alexander Payne's directorial debut, Citizen Ruth.

In 1997 James Mangold's Cop Land was well-received critically with a cast that included Sylvester Stallone, Robert De Niro, Ray Liotta, and Harvey Keitel. Through Independent Pictures, Woods produced films for New Line Cinema's division, Fine Line Features, such as Harmony Korine's directorial debut, Gummo.

In 2004, Woods became a Founding Partner, Co-Chairman and Chief Creative Officer of Plum TV, the luxury lifestyle network spanning eight markets (including Aspen, Sun Valley, the Hamptons, Miami Beach and Nantucket). Plum TV won eight Emmy Awards with programming encompassing real estate, interior design, travel, food and wine, style, wellness, art and culture.

In 2010, Woods wrote The PuzzleMan, a story that takes place in Paris, for Matchboox. In 2025, Woods was a producer on the PBS documentary Hard Hat Riot.

== Filmography ==
He was a producer in all films unless otherwise noted.

=== Film ===
| Year | Film | Credit |
|---|---|---|
| 1993 | So I Married an Axe Murderer | |
| 1993 | Rudy | |
| 1994 | Threesome | Executive producer |
| 1994 | Only You | |
| 1995 | Kids | |
| 1995 | Things to Do in Denver When You're Dead | |
| 1996 | Citizen Ruth | |
| 1996 | Beautiful Girls | |
| 1996 | Swingers | Executive producer |
| 1996 | Scream | |
| 1997 | Cop Land | |
| 1997 | Gummo | |
| 1998 | Wide Awake | |
| 1998 | Godzilla | Co-executive producer |
| 1999 | The Deep End | |
| 1999 | Buddy Boy | |
| 1999 | Julien Donkey-Boy | |
| 2000 | The Prime Gig | |
| TBA | A Boy Called Thunder | |
| TBA | Maggie Moore(s) | |
| TBA | Nak Sue: Fightergirl | Executive producer |
| TBA | Man | Executive producer |

=== Television ===
| Year | Title | Credit | Notes |
|---|---|---|---|
| 1995 | Clerks | Executive producer | Television pilot |
| TBA | The Raj at War | | |

As writer

| Year | Title |
|---|---|
| 2004 | The Player |
