= Thunder from the East =

2000 book by Nicholas Kristof and Sheryl WuDunn

- Author: Sheryl WuDunn; Nicholas Kristof
- Language: English
- Genre: Non-fiction
- Publication date: 2000
- ISBN: 0-375-70301-2

Thunder from the East: Portrait of a Rising Asia (ISBN 0-375-70301-2) is a 2000 book co-authored by husband and wife team Nicholas Kristof and Sheryl WuDunn. It is a nonfiction study of contemporary Asia.
