= Half the Sky =

2009 book by Sheryl WuDunn and Nicholas Kristof

Half the Sky: Turning Oppression into Opportunity for Women Worldwide
- Author: Sheryl WuDunn; Nicholas Kristof
- Subject: Sex trafficking, maternal mortality, genital mutilation, sexual violence, microfinance, girls' education
- Published: September 8, 2009
- Pages: 294 pp.
- Awards: Los Angeles Times Book Prize Nominee for Current Interest (2009)
- ISBN: 978-0-307-26714-6
- OCLC: 763098931

Half the Sky: Turning Oppression into Opportunity for Women Worldwide is a nonfiction book by husband and wife team Nicholas Kristof and Sheryl WuDunn, published by Knopf in September 2009. It is also a 2012 PBS documentary based on the book. The book argues that the oppression of women worldwide is "the paramount moral challenge" of the present era, much as the fight against slavery was in the past. The title comes from a famous Mao Zedong quote "women hold up half the sky," although the authors cite it only as a "Chinese proverb."

== Overview ==
Half the Sky focuses on prostitution, rape, education, maternal mortality, genital mutilation, micro-credit, and solutions in developing countries.

=== Prostitution ===
Prostitution is prevalent in developing countries. Kristof and Wudunn visit brothels to better understand this industry. Many girls are abducted at an early age. They might be sold by their families because they cannot afford raising them, or sold to pay off a family debt. At the brothel they will be drugged so that they give into the industry and will work all day long. This often leads to STDs and HIV. Some programs will come into the brothel undercover to provide condoms, but the sexual workers are not allowed to use them unless the customer allows it. Young girls are widely looked for by customers. They will pay extra to sleep with a virgin. Some people believe that sleeping with a virgin will clean them of any STDs they may have and infect the worker. They found that many prostitutes become so entangled in the industry that even when they are able to leave the brothel they tend to come back because they internalize that the brothel is where they belong. Some women are financially indebted to their pimps making their stay longer. During their time they also experience physical and sexual violence.

=== Rape ===
The authors point out that most rapists are people the survivor knows, sometimes even family members. The survivor's story is usually hidden from the community and when it does arise, the survivor is usually not believed. The woman will also bring "shame" to the family and this sometimes leads to her killing in order to preserve the family honor. A rape can also lead to a woman having to marry her rapist.

=== Maternal mortality ===
Due to the lack of prenatal care and few hospitals in some third world countries, many women, and sometimes their babies as well, may experience health risks and even die. This may be the case where home births are the rule. A woman who has undergone genital mutilation can also have difficulties giving birth, especially when this results in a uterine fistula which if it heals poorly, can significantly degrade her quality of life.

=== Education ===
WuDunn and Kristoff make the claim that if girls were allowed to garner an education they would be able to prosper. At this point in time however, it is preferred for boys to go to school than girls because it is believed that they will actually be able to make something out of themselves. Many families have to choose between which of their kids will gain an education because uniforms and school fees might be hard to keep up with if every child goes to school. Girls might also work early on, preventing them from school. Education for girls is also shamed by communities because they fear what an educated woman can do. Some men might not even want to marry an educated woman due to the fear that they will be deemed as inferior to her.

=== Solutions ===
Along with providing a scope on issues, the movie provides a series of solutions to help reduce the disparity between men and women in developing countries, including micro-credits for women to start independent businesses, modern soap operas that help spread the idea of such independent women, providing care products to schoolgirls to prevent them from missing school, as the brand Always has been doing, and allowing girls to attend school beyond elementary school.

== Feminist criticism ==
Half the Sky has come under criticism for reinforcing stereotypes surrounding women of the Global South. Using Chandra Talpade Mohanty's conceptualisation of discursive colonialism, Sophia Chong (2014) argues that WuDunn and Kristoff are de-emphasising the agency of women in the Global South, and portraying societies in which they exist as absolutely dystopic.

== Media ==
=== Reception ===
Carolyn See, a book critic for the Washington Post, said in her review: " 'Half the Sky' is a call to arms, a call for help, a call for contributions, but also a call for volunteers. It asks us to open our eyes to this enormous humanitarian issue. It does so with exquisitely crafted prose and sensationally interesting material. . . . I really do think this is one of the most important books I have ever reviewed."

=== Documentary ===
In October 2012, the PBS television series Independent Lens presented a four-hour documentary based on the book as a two-night special. The film follows the book's authors and celebrity advocates America Ferrera, Diane Lane, Eva Mendes, Meg Ryan, Gabrielle Union, and Olivia Wilde to ten countries: Afghanistan, Cambodia, Kenya, India, Liberia, Pakistan, Sierra Leone, Somalia, Vietnam and the US. In each country, the film introduces women and girls bravely fighting to rise above very difficult circumstances. Their stories expose the blight caused by sex trafficking, forced prostitution, maternal mortality, and gender-based violence as the authors propose that micro-finance and female education can help.

The six actresses travel to different countries to observe the mistreatment of women, physically and psychologically. The actresses and Kristof visited organizations that gave opportunities to women that are often overlooked and maltreated. They also met the victims of sex trafficking, child labor, sexual violence and genital mutilation. Most of these women/young girls did not obtain an education and some had been abducted from their families. Throughout the documentary it is evident how men in women's lives always have the upper-hand, whether it is shown through support from the community towards them or the corrupt legal system in these countries.

This documentary shows the serious issue of violence against women’s bodies. India has the biggest trafficking problem in the world. Because of the caste system, many women are taught to accept their fate instead of protecting their value of life. Many of the girls are sold to brothels because their parents could not afford supporting them or use them to pay debts. These girls’ living conditions are dreadful. Doors are locked from the outside, and the room is small, dark and dirty. They were treated as objects, raped and sexually abused by men. Diseases were transmitted to their bodies; however, they had no say to their bodies. They get HIV and AIDS because condoms are not provided and they take several clients in a single day. They also face abortion. In the book, “Half the Sky”, Nicholas Kristof and Sheryl Wudunn expanded more on the brothel. Sex business seems legal in the society. “The police wouldn’t listen to her. The brothel owners not only threatened to kill her, they also threatened to kidnap her two young daughters and sell them to a brothel,” states in the book (8). In the film, when Nicholas Kristof and Urmi tried to rescue the victims, they were threatened and yelled by the brothel. The police were there but did not do anything to warn the brothel, instead, they asked Nicholas Kristof and Urmi to leave. Moreover, Nicholas Kristof mentioned that the international Labour Organization estimates that at any one time there are 12.3 million people engaged in forced labor of all kinds, not just sexual servitude.

One of the serious issues that was found in Somaliland is female genital mutilation. The birth attendants, in the documentary, told Kristof that once they know the practice would risk women's health and bodies, so they stop exercising it. However, they find out the truth that one of them actually cut her own daughter. Girls do not have control over their bodies. They are taught that genital mutilation is the practice for females, and when they become mothers, they do the same to their daughters.

=== USAID game ===
In an opinion piece in 2025, Kristoff noted parenthetically as he decried the attempted abolition of USAID, "In 2012, U.S.A.I.D. made some games for India and Africa based on a book my wife and I wrote, 'Half the Sky.' U.S.A.I.D. did not pay us anything for this, and the games did a good job promoting deworming, girls’ education and safe pregnancy."

== Activism and supporting organization ==
In those nations, there are organizations to support and aid those victims. For instance, in India, many children are treated as child labor and girls are obliged to take clients at a young age. Urmi, who works with the New Light Program, encourages them to obtain education and assists them to fight for their opportunities to speak for themselves. In other case, Amie, who works with International Rescue Committee, creates the “Rainbo Center” and helps victims escape from the tragedy of rape. Moreover, John Wood, who works at “Room to Read”, helps and supports education in Vietnam. Many of these victims are fighting for their rights and freedom. With the help and encouragement from people around the world, they are more likely capable of escaping from their treacherous lives to a more hopeful future.

== See also ==
- Half the Sky movement
- Meena, a short film based on the first chapter of the book
