= The Irish in America: Long Journey Home =

1998 American television miniseries

- Genre: Documentary
- Narrated by: Michael Murphy
- Music by: Paddy Moloney; Elvis Costello
- Country of origin: United States

Production
- Production location: Ireland
- Running time: 6 hours

Original release
- Network: PBS
- Release: 1998 – 1998

The Irish in America: Long Journey Home is a 6-hour miniseries about the Irish Americans that was filmed in Ireland and New York City, and distributed through Walt Disney, and broadcast on PBS in 1998. The film was narrated by American actor Michael Murphy.

The production was nominated for two News and Documentary Emmy Awards: for Outstanding Historical Programming, and in the category of Outstanding Achievement in a Craft in News and Documentary Programming - Editing, with the latter of the two nominations winning, in 1999. The soundtrack, by Paddy Moloney of The Chieftains and Elvis Costello, won the Grammy Award for Best Traditional Folk Album in 1999.
