= Carlton, Oregon =

City in Oregon, U.S.

- City
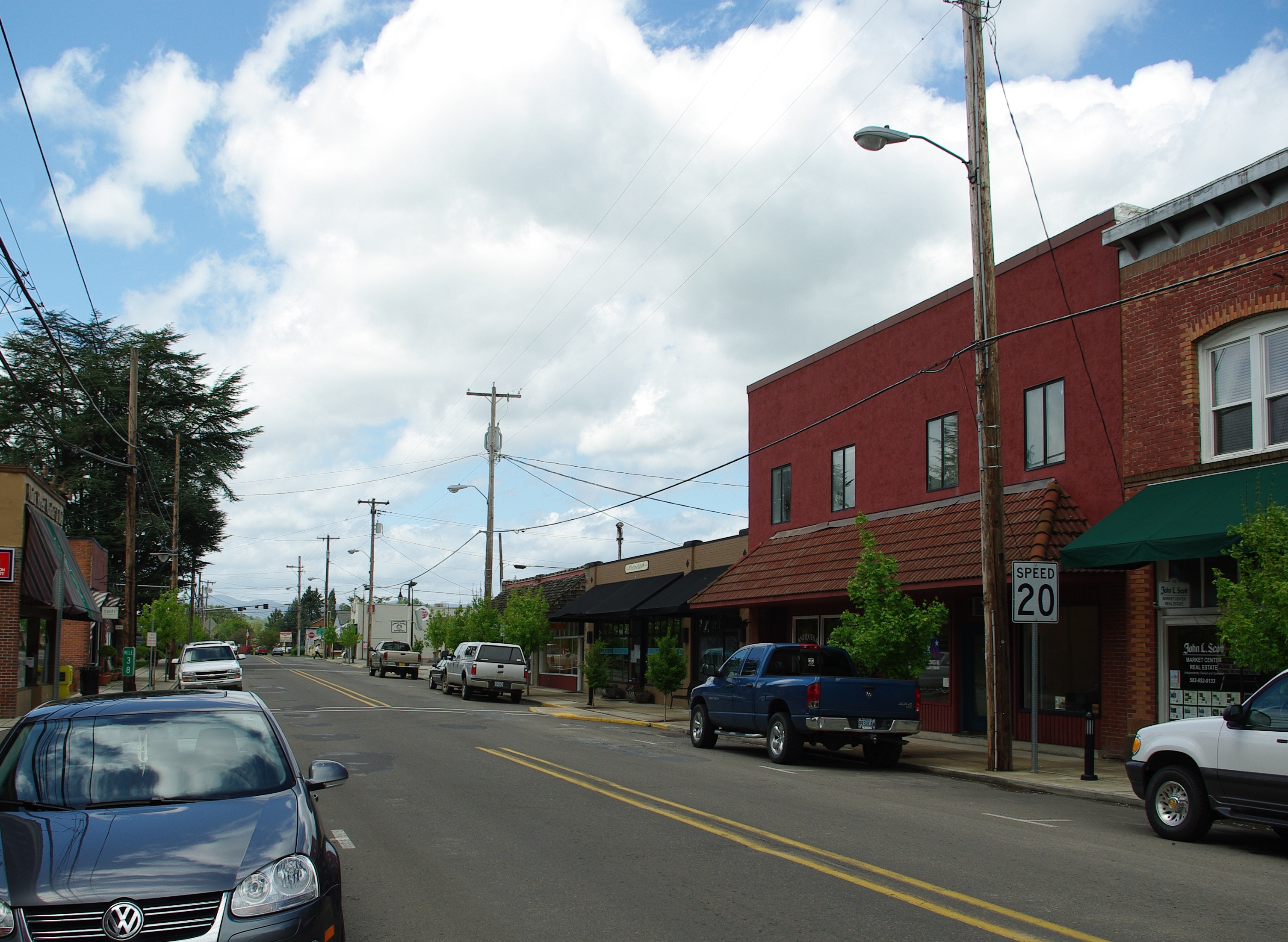
- Main Street in Carlton looking west
- Motto: A Great Little Town
- Location in Oregon
- Coordinates: 45°17′40″N 123°10′31″W
- Country: United States
- State: Oregon
- County: Yamhill
- Incorporated: 1899

Government
  - Mayor: Linda Watkins

Area
  - Total: 0.88 sq mi (2.29 km^{2})
  - Land: 0.88 sq mi (2.29 km^{2})
  - Water: 0 sq mi (0.00 km^{2})
- Elevation: 197 ft (60 m)

Population (2020)
  - Total: 2,220
  - Density: 2,514.7/sq mi (970.93/km^{2})
- Time zone: UTC-8 (Pacific)
  - Summer (DST): UTC-7 (Pacific)
- ZIP code: 97111
- Area code: 503
- FIPS code: 41-11150
- GNIS feature ID: 2409986
- Website: www.ci.carlton.or.us

Carlton is a city in Yamhill County, Oregon, United States. The population was 2,135 as of the 2020 Census.

== History ==
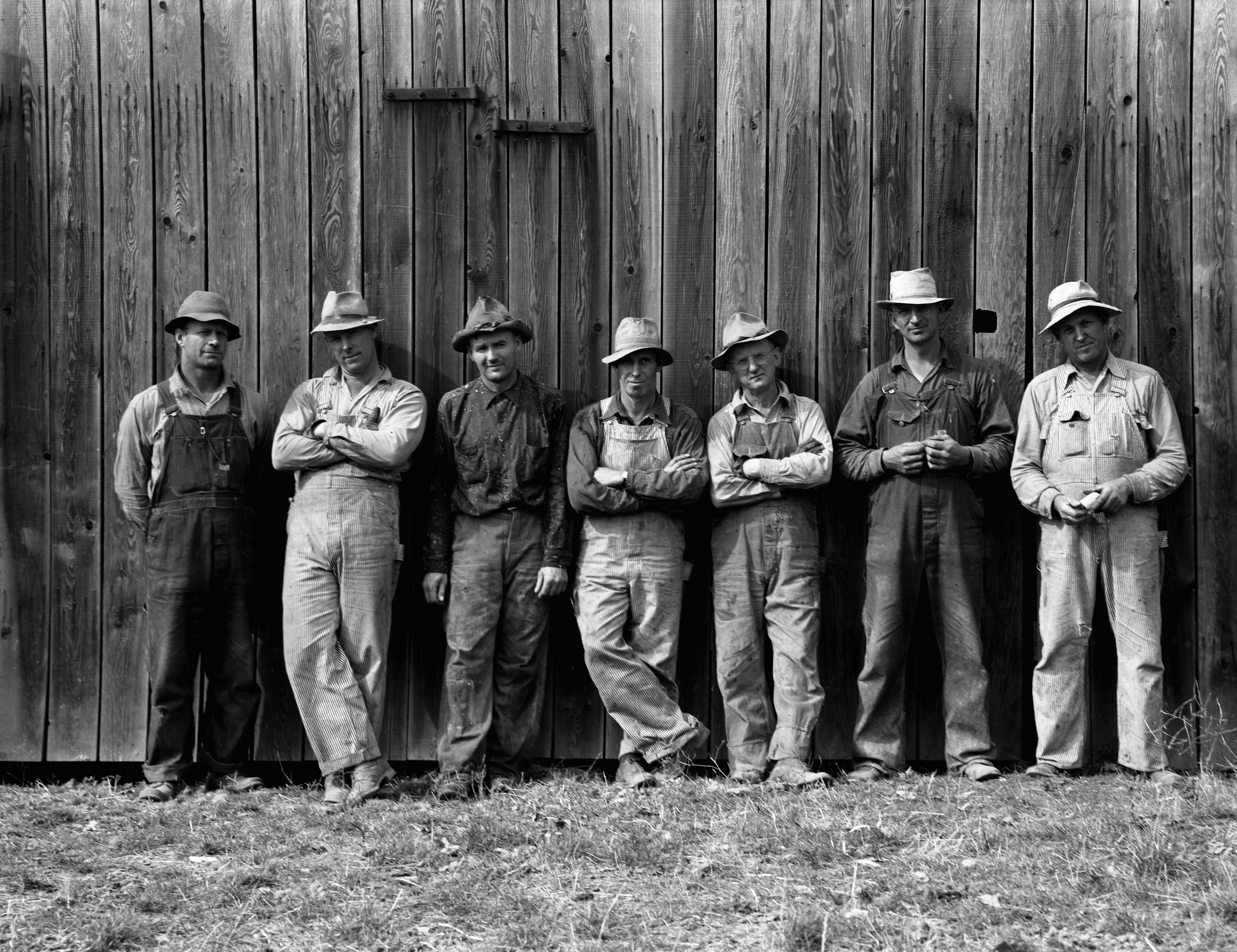
Dorothea Lange photo of farmers in West Carlton in 1939

Historical population
Census	Pop.	Note	%±
1880	243		—
1900	145		—
1910	386		166.2%
1920	552		43.0%
1930	749		35.7%
1940	864		15.4%
1950	1,081		25.1%
1960	959		−11.3%
1970	1,126		17.4%
1980	1,302		15.6%
1990	1,289		−1.0%
2000	1,514		17.5%
2010	2,007		32.6%
2020	2,135		6.4%
U.S. Decennial Census

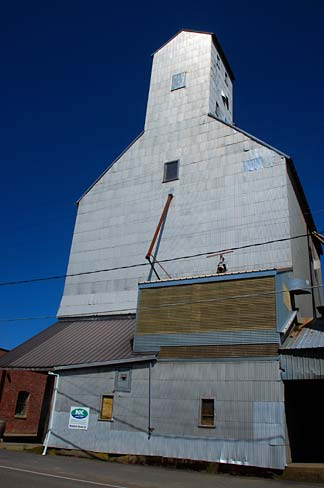
DowGrain elevator in Carlton

The origin of Carlton's name is disputed. An ex-county commissioner claims that the name was derived from Wilson Carl, whereas A. E. Bones, postmaster at Carlton, stated in a 1925 letter that it was named for John Carl Sr., at the request of R. R. Thompson. These men may have been part of the same family.

Carlton post office was established in 1874, with F. J. Fryer serving as its first postmaster.

Prior to the post office inside the city of Carlton, Wilson Carl owned the original post office, stagecoach stop, and blacksmith shop for the area, about 7 miles (11 km) west of Carlton, and his home was known as Mountain House. Wilson Carl was the original postmaster. Wilson Carl traveled with Dr. Joel Knight on the Oregon Trail to the area, as witnessed in the diary of Amelia Stewart KnigKnigWilson Carl negotiated with the railroad in Portland, Oregon, to build closer to his property. Since the original plot was over the mountain West of Carlton, it was a matter of convenience for the railroad to build where it presently is, because negotiating the mountain was not feasible. The population of Carlton expanded to become the city of Carlton, around the railroad. The city is named after Wilson Carl, and was originally called Carl's town. A few other variations of his name were used before the name became Carlton. Wilson Carl began as a pioneer carpenter/builder and shoemaker who became a wealthy land owner, who built a portion of what is now Linfield College, in McMinnville, and was founder of the Republican Party in McMinnville, County Commissioner, and, at one time owned the property that the Yamhill County Courthouse presently sits on. The original post office still exists on his original homestead and plot of land, though it has since been used as a residence for his heirs and is currently unoccupied. There is further information about the name variations used for Carlton, in a former Oregon Blue Book.

== Geography ==
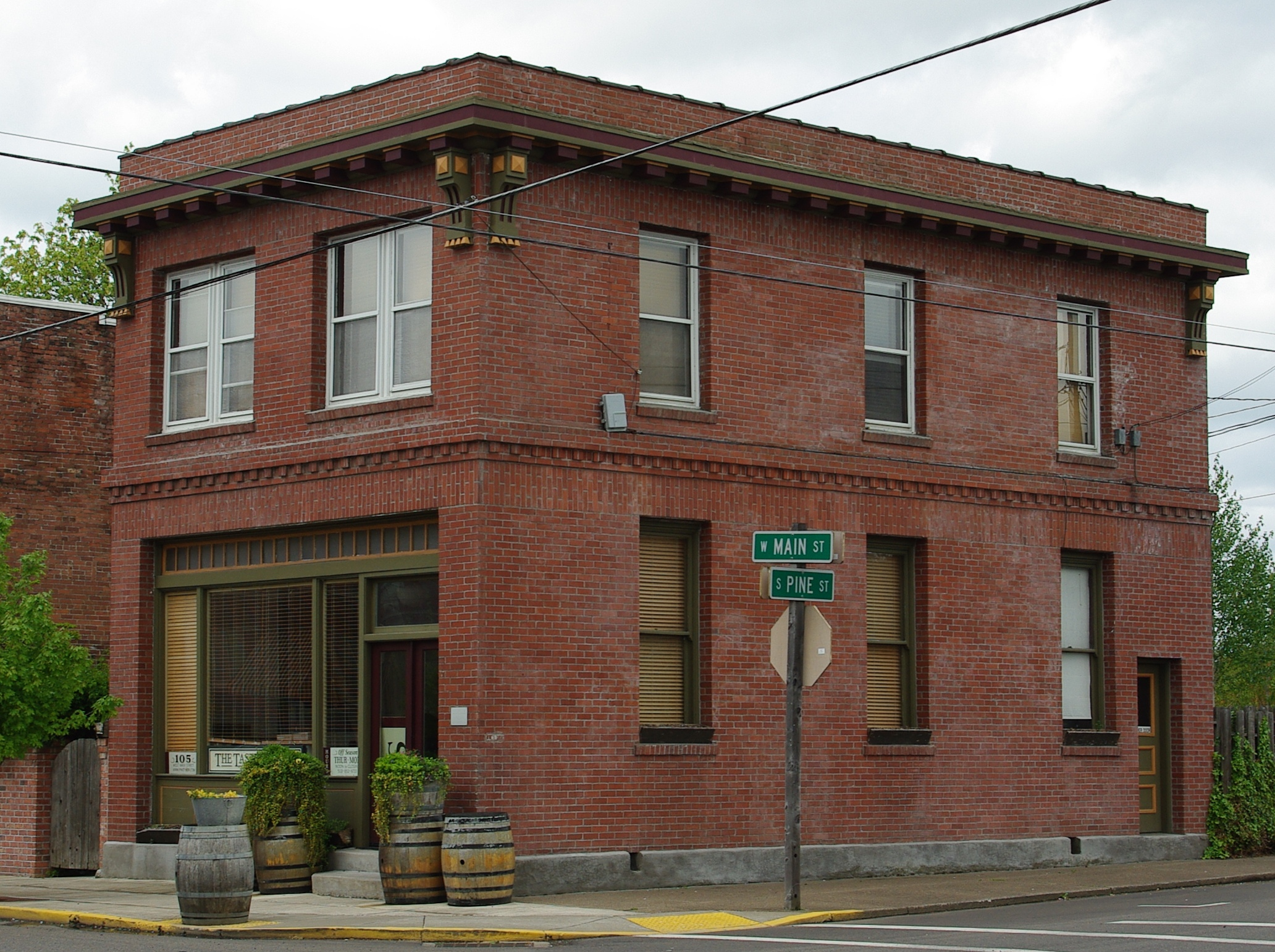
Carlton State and Savings Bank on Main Street is listed on the National Register of Historic Places.

According to the United States Census Bureau, the city has a total area of 0.88 square miles (2.28 km^{2}), all of it land.

== Demographics ==
=== 2020 census ===
As of the 2020 census, Carlton had a population of 2,220. The median age was 38.9 years; 23.7% of residents were under the age of 18 and 14.3% of residents were 65 years of age or older. For every 100 females there were 96.8 males, and for every 100 females age 18 and over there were 96.3 males age 18 and over.

There were 815 households in Carlton, of which 35.8% had children under the age of 18 living in them. Of all households, 57.9% were married-couple households, 15.3% were households with a male householder and no spouse or partner present, and 20.9% were households with a female householder and no spouse or partner present. About 15.9% of households were made up of individuals and 7.7% had someone living alone who was 65 years of age or older.

There were 870 housing units, of which 6.3% were vacant. Among occupied housing units, 78.9% were owner-occupied and 21.1% were renter-occupied. The homeowner vacancy rate was 0.8% and the rental vacancy rate was 5.5%.

0% of residents lived in urban areas, while 100.0% lived in rural areas.

Racial composition as of the 2020 census
Race	Number	Percent
White	1,822	82.1%
Black or African American	9	0.4%
American Indian and Alaska Native	30	1.4%
Asian	21	0.9%
Native Hawaiian and Other Pacific Islander	6	0.3%
Some other race	115	5.2%
Two or more races	217	9.8%
Hispanic or Latino (of any race)	206	9.3%

== Education ==
Residents are zoned to the Yamhill Carlton School District, headquartered in Yamhill.

Yamhill-Carlton Elementary School (YCES) is located in Carlton, and Yamhill-Carlton Intermediate School (YCIS) and Yamhill Carlton High School (YCHS) are in Yamhill.

== Notable people ==
- Peter Broderick, musician
- Matt Marshall, golfer
