= Yamhill, Oregon =

Yamhill
- City
- Yamhill, Oregon
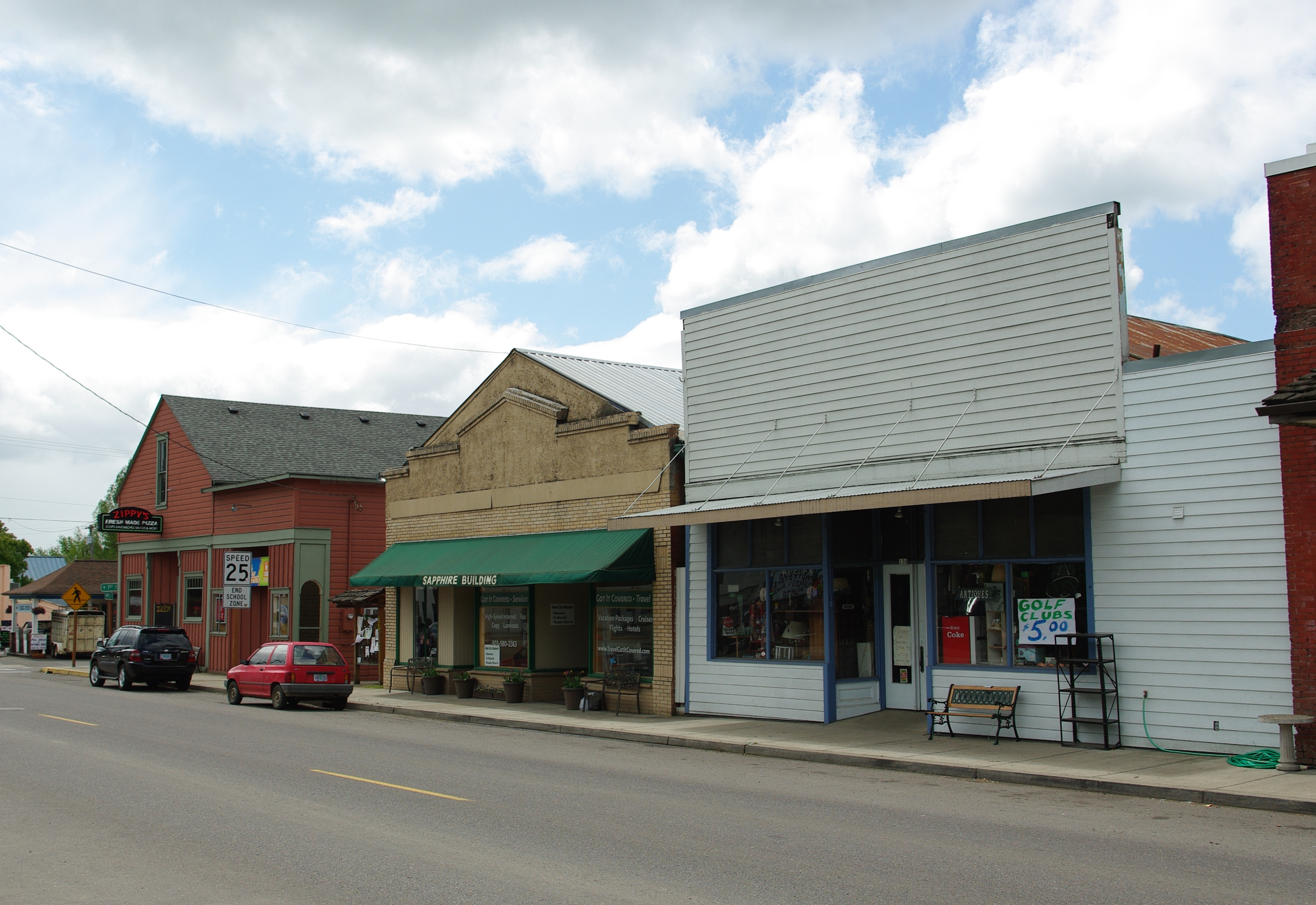
- Maple Street in Yamhill
- Motto: A Small Taste of Oregon
- Location in Oregon
- Coordinates: 45°20′27″N 123°11′04″W
- Country: United States
- State: Oregon
- County: Yamhill
- Incorporated: 1891

Government
  - Mayor: Shea Corrigan

Area
  - Total: 0.49 sq mi (1.26 km^{2})
  - Land: 0.49 sq mi (1.26 km^{2})
  - Water: 0 sq mi (0.00 km^{2})
- Elevation: 184 ft (56 m)

Population (2020)
  - Total: 1,147
  - Density: 2,353.4/sq mi (908.66/km^{2})
- Time zone: UTC-8 (Pacific)
  - Summer (DST): UTC-7 (Pacific)
- ZIP code: 97148
- Area code: 503
- FIPS code: 41-84250
- GNIS feature ID: 2412316
- Website: cityofyamhill.org

Yamhill is a city in Yamhill County, Oregon, United States. Located in the northern part of the county, it is situated at the intersection of Oregon Route 47 and Oregon Route 240. The population was 1,147 at the 2020 census. Originally named North Yamhill, it was incorporated under that name by the Oregon Legislative Assembly on February 20, 1891.

== Geography ==
According to the United States Census Bureau, the city has a total area of 0.42 square miles (1.09 km^{2}), all of it land.

=== Climate ===
This region experiences warm (but not hot) and dry summers, with no average monthly temperatures above 71.6 °F (22.0 °C). According to the Köppen Climate Classification system, Yamhill has a warm-summer Mediterranean climate, abbreviated Csb on climate maps.

== Demographics ==
Historical population
Census	Pop.	Note	%±
1900	254		—
1910	325		28.0%
1920	365		12.3%
1930	390		6.8%
1940	418		7.2%
1950	539		28.9%
1960	407		−24.5%
1970	516		26.8%
1980	690		33.7%
1990	855		23.9%
2000	794		−7.1%
2010	1,024		29.0%
2020	1,147		12.0%
U.S. Decennial Census

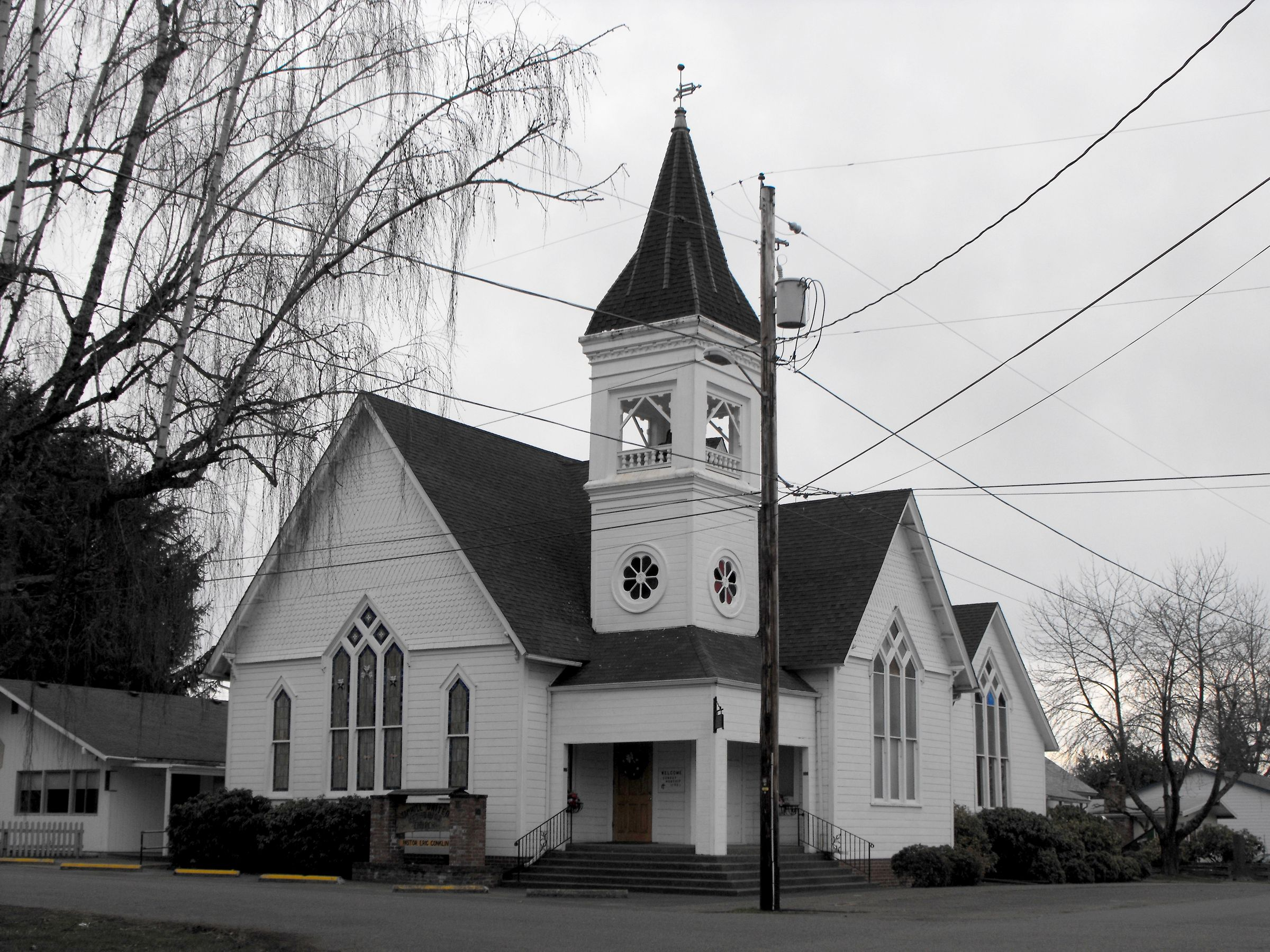
Yamhill United Methodist Church

=== 2020 census ===
As of the 2020 census, Yamhill had a population of 1,147. The median age was 39.1 years; 26.8% of residents were under the age of 18 and 15.8% were 65 years of age or older. For every 100 females there were 101.2 males, and for every 100 females age 18 and over there were 96.3 males age 18 and over.

0% of residents lived in urban areas, while 100.0% lived in rural areas.

There were 393 households in Yamhill, of which 39.9% had children under the age of 18 living in them. Of all households, 60.3% were married-couple households, 11.5% were households with a male householder and no spouse or partner present, and 19.3% were households with a female householder and no spouse or partner present. About 14.7% of all households were made up of individuals and 7.7% had someone living alone who was 65 years of age or older.

There were 403 housing units, of which 2.5% were vacant. Among occupied housing units, 82.7% were owner-occupied and 17.3% were renter-occupied. The homeowner vacancy rate was 0.6% and the rental vacancy rate was <0.1%.

Racial composition as of the 2020 census
Race	Number	Percent
White	1,018	88.8%
Black or African American	0	0%
American Indian and Alaska Native	8	0.7%
Asian	13	1.1%
Native Hawaiian and Other Pacific Islander	3	0.3%
Some other race	17	1.5%
Two or more races	88	7.7%
Hispanic or Latino (of any race)	87	7.6%

=== 2010 census ===
As of the census of 2010, there were 1,024 people, 353 households, and 285 families residing in the city. The population density was 2,438.1 inhabitants per square mile (941.4/km^{2}). There were 375 housing units at an average density of 892.9 per square mile (344.8/km^{2}). The racial makeup of the city was 91.2% White, 0.1% African American, 1.3% Native American, 1.1% Asian, 2.6% from other races, and 3.7% from two or more races. Hispanic or Latino of any race were 5.5% of the population.

There were 353 households, of which 42.8% had children under the age of 18 living with them, 63.5% were married couples living together, 11.6% had a female householder with no husband present, 5.7% had a male householder with no wife present, and 19.3% were non-families. 13.3% of all households were made up of individuals, and 4.8% had someone living alone who was 65 years of age or older. The average household size was 2.88 and the average family size was 3.13.

The median age in the city was 37.6 years. 27.7% of residents were under the age of 18; 6.8% were between the ages of 18 and 24; 25.6% were from 25 to 44; 31% were from 45 to 64; and 8.9% were 65 years of age or older. The gender makeup of the city was 49.4% male and 50.6% female.

=== 2000 census ===
As of the census of 2000, there were 794 people, 256 households, and 207 families residing in the city. The population density was 1,974.3 people per square mile (762.3 people/km^{2}). There were 267 housing units at an average density of 663.9 per square mile (256.3/km^{2}). The racial makeup of the city was 96.47% White, 0.25% Native American, 1.39% Asian, 0.38% from other races, and 1.51% from two or more races. Hispanic or Latino of any race were 4.79% of the population.

There were 256 households, out of which 46.5% had children under the age of 18 living with them, 65.6% were married couples living together, 10.5% had a female householder with no husband present, and 19.1% were non-families. 16.4% of all households were made up of individuals, and 7.8% had someone living alone who was 65 years of age or older. The average household size was 3.10 and the average family size was 3.43.

In the city, the population was spread out, with 31.7% under the age of 18, 10.7% from 18 to 24, 27.6% from 25 to 44, 22.8% from 45 to 64, and 7.2% who were 65 years of age or older. The median age was 32 years. For every 100 females, there were 98.0 males. For every 100 females age 18 and over, there were 96.4 males.

The median income for a household in the city was $49,688, and the median income for a family was $52,344. Males had a median income of $38,661 versus $24,583 for females. The per capita income for the city was $16,745. About 5.3% of families and 5.1% of the population were below the poverty line, including 6.9% of those under age 18 and none of those age 65 or over.

== Education ==
The Yamhill Carlton School District is headquartered in Yamhill. Students attend Yamhill Carlton Elementary School (YCES) in Carlton, Yamhill Carlton Intermediate School (YCIS), or Yamhill Carlton High School (YCHS), both located in Yamhill.

== Notable people ==
- Elette Boyle, computer scientist and cryptographer, a professor of computer science at the Interdisciplinary Center Herzliya
- Beverly Cleary, children's author; her first memoir was called A Girl from Yamhill
- Thurston Daniels, third Lieutenant Governor of Washington
- Nicholas Kristof, former columnist for The New York Times, grew up on a farm in Yamhill

== Architecture ==
The John Marion Bunn House and Lee Laughlin House are both listed on the National Register of Historic Places. The Percy L. Menefee Ranch House, 8 mi (13 km) northwest of Yamhill, was designed by architect Pietro Belluschi in 1948, winning national awards and acclaim.

== Media ==
- Fire! was shot partially in Yamhill.

== Gallery ==
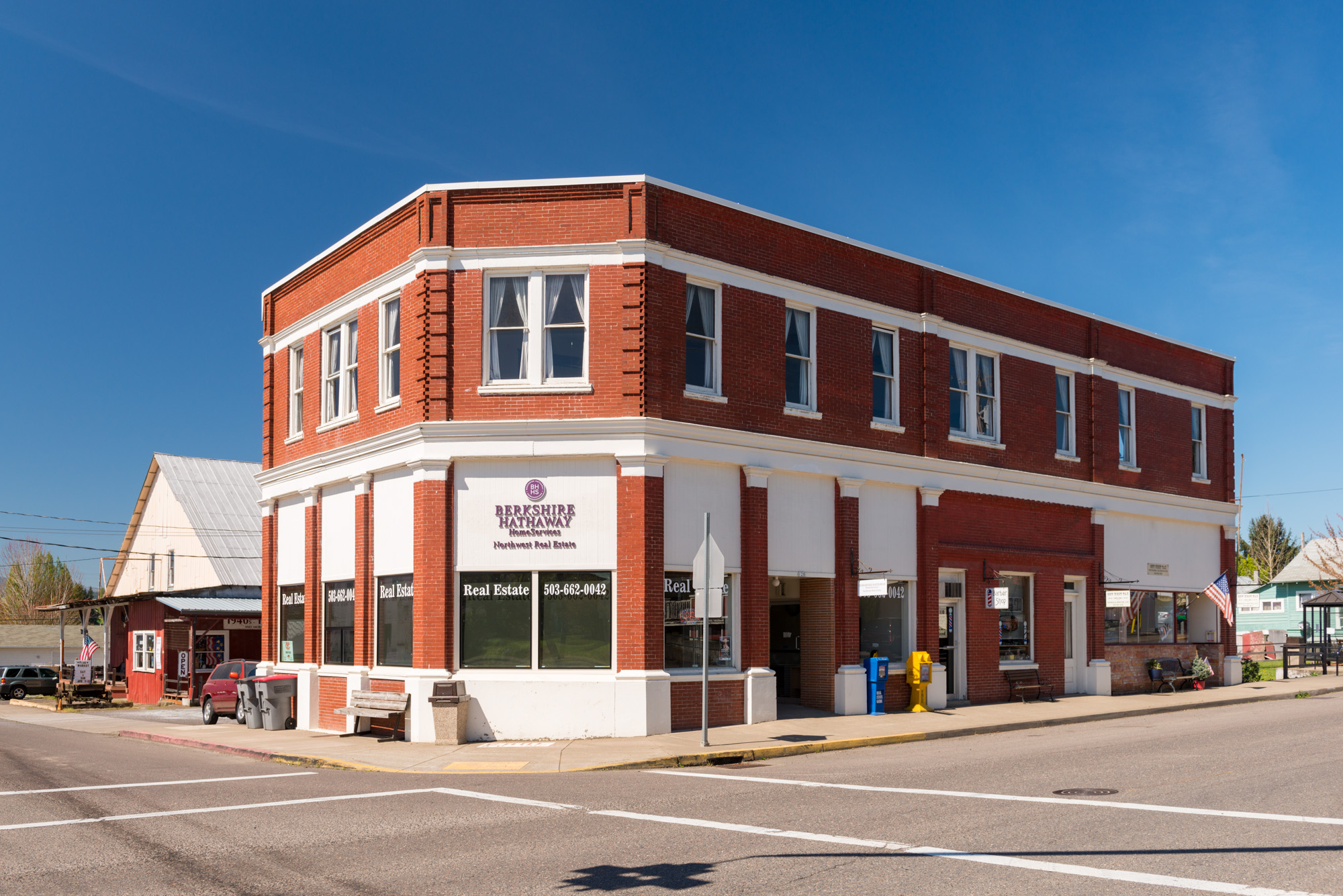
Building in downtown Yamhill

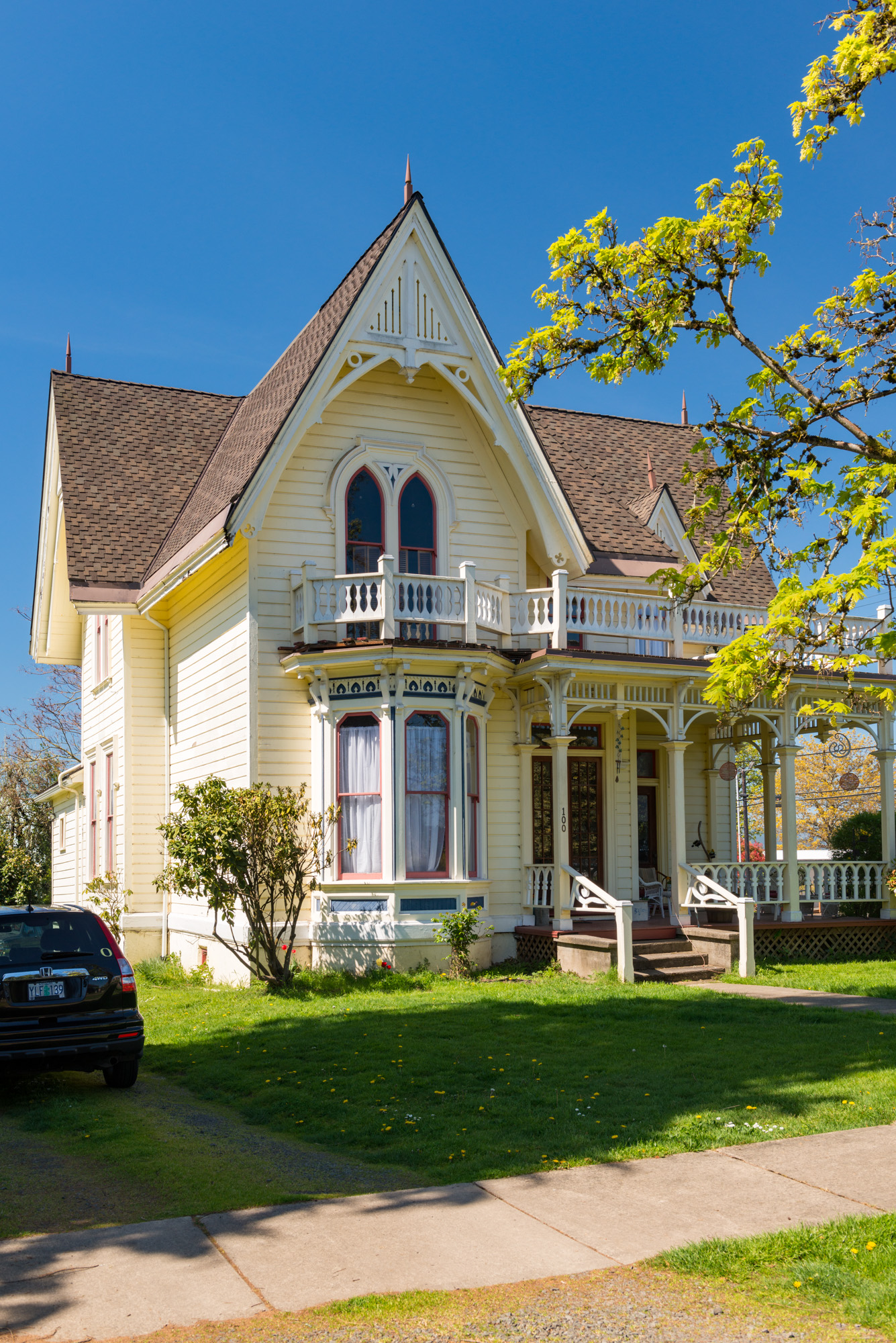
Lee Laughlin House

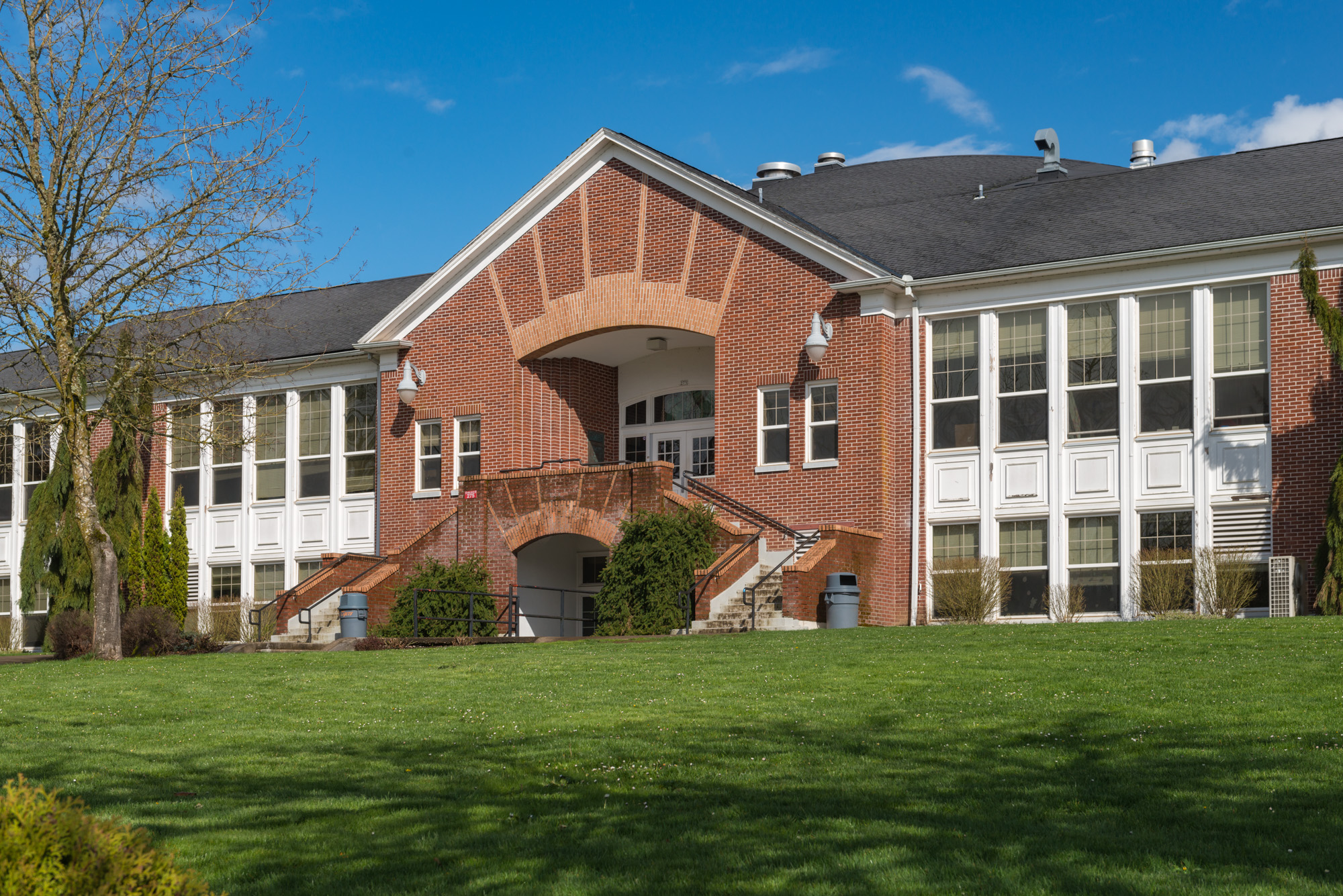
Yamhill-Carlton High School
