= Nicholas Kristof =

American journalist and political commentator (born 1959)

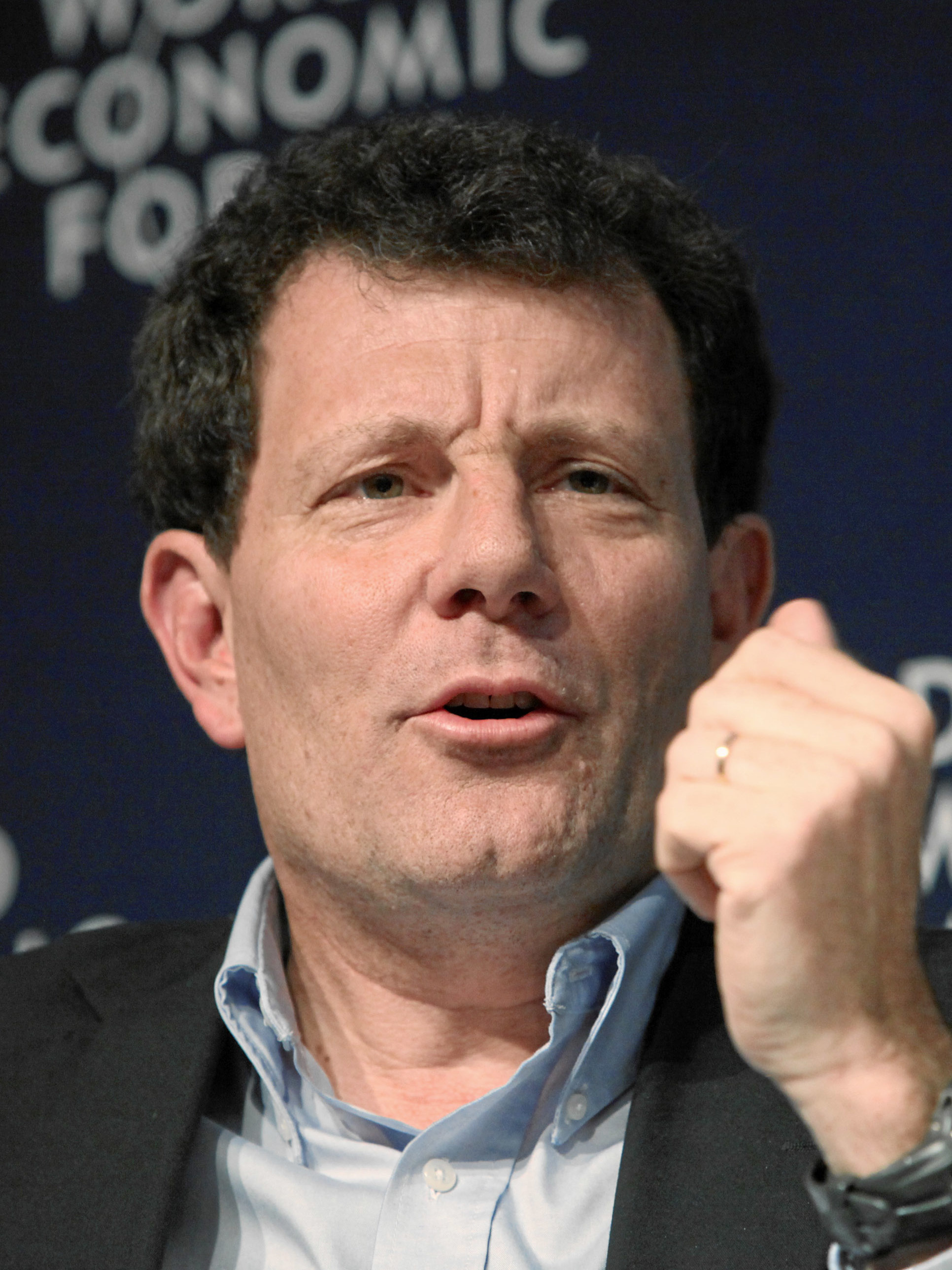
- Kristof in 2010
- Born: Nicholas Donabet Kristof; April 27, 1959 (age 67); Chicago, Illinois, U.S.
- Education: Harvard University (BA); Magdalen College, Oxford (BA)
- Occupations: Journalist; author; columnist
- Years active: 1984–present
- Political party: Democratic
- Spouse: Sheryl WuDunn (m. 1988)
- Children: 3
- Website: Campaign website

Signature
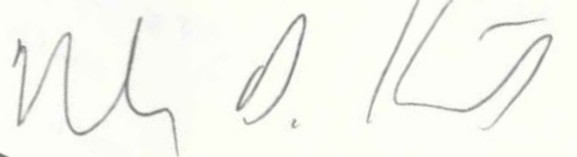

Nicholas Donabet Kristof (born April 27, 1959) is an American journalist and political commentator. A winner of two Pulitzer Prizes, he is a regular CNN contributor and an op-ed columnist for The New York Times.

Born in Chicago, Kristof was raised in Yamhill, Oregon, the son of two professors at nearby Portland State University. After graduating from Harvard University, where he wrote for The Harvard Crimson, Kristof intermittently interned at The Oregonian. He joined the staff of The New York Times in 1984.

Kristof is a self-described progressive. According to The Washington Post, Kristof "rewrote opinion journalism" with his emphasis on human rights abuses and social injustices, such as human trafficking and the Darfur conflict. Archbishop Desmond Tutu of South Africa described Kristof as an "honorary African" for shining a spotlight on neglected conflicts in the continent.

== Early life and education ==
Kristof was born in Chicago, Illinois, and grew up on a family sheep farm and cherry orchard in Yamhill, Oregon. He is the son of Jane Kristof (née McWilliams) and Ladis "Kris" Kristof (born Władysław Krzysztofowicz; 1918–2010), both long-time professors at Portland State University in Portland, Oregon. His father, who was born to Polish and Armenian parents in Chernivtsi, former Austria-Hungary, immigrated to the United States after World War II.

Kristof graduated from Yamhill Carlton High School, where he was student body president and school newspaper editor. He attended Harvard College, where he was a Phi Beta Kappa graduate. At Harvard, he studied government, interned at Portland's The Oregonian, and worked on The Harvard Crimson newspaper. According to a profile of him, "Alums recall Kristof as one of the brightest undergraduates on campus."

After Harvard, he studied law at Magdalen College, Oxford, as a Rhodes Scholar. He earned his law degree with first-class honors and won an academic prize (awarded as an earned Bachelor of Arts at Oxford, and promoted per tradition to a Master of Arts). He studied Arabic in Egypt for the 1983–84 academic year at the American University in Cairo. He has a number of honorary degrees.

== Career ==
After joining The New York Times in 1984, initially covering economics, Kristof worked as a correspondent for the company in Los Angeles. Throughout his career there, he became the NYT’s bureau chief in Hong Kong from 1987 to 1988, Beijing from 1988 to 1993 and Tokyo where he succeeded David E. Sanger from 1995 to 1999, before becoming a columnist in 2001. He rose to be associate managing editor of The New York Times, responsible for Sunday editions. His columns have often focused on global health, poverty, and gender issues in the developing world. In particular, since 2004 he has written dozens of columns about Darfur and visited the area 11 times.

As of 2008, Kristof had visited 140 countries. Jeffrey Toobin of CNN and The New Yorker, a Harvard classmate, has said: "I'm not surprised to see him emerge as the moral conscience of our generation of journalists. I am surprised to see him as the Indiana Jones of our generation of journalists."

Bill Clinton said of Kristof in September 2009:

"There is no one in journalism, anywhere in the United States at least, who has done anything like the work he has done to figure out how poor people are actually living around the world, and what their potential is. So every American citizen who cares about this should be profoundly grateful that someone in our press establishment cares enough about this to haul himself all around the world to figure out what's going on. ... I am personally in his debt, as are we all."

Kristof was a member of the board of overseers of Harvard University, where he was chief marshal of commencement for his 25th reunion. He is a member of the board of trustees of the Association of American Rhodes Scholars. Joyce Barnathan, president of the International Center for Journalists, said in a 2013 statement: "Nick Kristof is the conscience of international journalism."

In 2020, Darren Walker of the Ford Foundation described Kristof as "journalism's North Star on issues of poverty, dignity and justice."

Between 2010 and 2018 Kristof wrote three articles about Kevin Cooper, who had been sentenced to death for murdering a family in California. Kristof made the case that Cooper had been framed by a racist Sheriff's department and that the true killer was a white contract killer named Lee Furrow. After the third article, both U.S. Senators from California, Kamala Harris and Dianne Feinstein, called for a second round of DNA testing. Seven months after the article was published, departing Governor Jerry Brown authorized limited retesting to settle the issue; the testing was ultimately inconclusive and questions have been raised about the impartiality and effectiveness of the investigation.

On November 12, 2016, Kristof chased and tackled an intruder burglarizing his room at the Franklin Hotel near Independence Hall in Philadelphia. In a blog post titled "Why You Should Always Lock Your Hotel Room Door", published in The New York Times later that day, Kristof wrote that the thief threatened multiple times to stab him and was restrained in the lobby with the help of hotel employees.

=== Oregon gubernatorial campaign ===
In July 2021, research was conducted to establish his potential as a candidate for governor of Oregon in the 2022 Oregon gubernatorial election. In October 2021, Kristof left The New York Times after forming a political action committee for his potential candidacy, saying in a statement,

"Precisely because I have a great job, outstanding editors and the best readers, I may be an idiot to leave. But you all know how much I love Oregon, and how much I've been seared by the suffering of old friends there. So I've reluctantly concluded that I should try not only to expose problems but also see if I can fix them directly."

On Twitter, a New York Times features editor, Hillary Howard, wrote, "Nick had a remarkable talent for never taking anything personally, for never letting his ego get in the way. At a place as competitive as the Times, this trait really stood out. He somehow seemed like this innocent, unchanged after dining with warlords or interviewing pimps. This trait will serve him well, should he go into politics." Other colleagues described Kristof as a mentor to young journalists.

On October 27, 2021, Kristof officially announced he would run for governor as a Democrat. A day later, on October 28, 2021, the Times published an essay by Kristof in which he wrote,

"I love journalism, but I also love my home state. I keep thinking of Theodore Roosevelt's dictum: 'It is not the critic who counts, not the man who points out how the strong man stumbles,' he said. 'The credit belongs to the man who is actually in the arena.'"

On January 6, 2022, Shemia Fagan, the Oregon Secretary of State, announced that Kristof was ineligible to run as he did not meet the state's residency requirements. Kristof challenged the decision in court but on February 17, the Oregon Supreme Court upheld the Secretary of State's ruling.

On August 1, 2022, Kristof and The New York Times announced that he would return to his job as a columnist. His first new column since returning to the paper was published on November 16, 2022.

== Prizes ==
In 1990, Kristof and his wife, Sheryl WuDunn, won a Pulitzer Prize for International Reporting for their reporting on the pro-democracy student movement and the related Tiananmen Square protests of 1989. They were the first married couple to win a Pulitzer for journalism. Kristof has also received the George Polk Award and an award from the Overseas Press Club for his reporting which focuses on human rights and environmental issues.

Kristof was a finalist for the Pulitzer Prize for Commentary in 2004 and again in 2005 "for his powerful columns that portrayed suffering among the developing world's often forgotten people and stirred action." In 2006 Kristof won his second Pulitzer, the Pulitzer Prize for Commentary "for his graphic, deeply reported columns that, at personal risk, focused attention on genocide in Darfur and that gave voice to the voiceless in other parts of the world." Kristof was a finalist for a Pulitzer Prize again in 2012 and 2016; altogether, he has been a Pulitzer finalist seven times.

In 2008, Kristof received the Golden Plate Award of the American Academy of Achievement.

In 2009, Kristof and WuDunn received the Dayton Literary Peace Prize's 2009 Lifetime Achievement Award. Together, they also received the 2009 World of Children Lifetime Achievement Award. He has also won the 2008 Anne Frank Award, the 2007 Fred Cuny Award for Prevention of Deadly Conflict, and the 2013 Advancing Global Health Award (from Seattle Biomed). Commentators have occasionally suggested Kristof for the Nobel Peace Prize, but when Media Web named Kristof its "print journalist of the year" in 2006 and asked him about that, it quoted him as saying: "I can't imagine it going to a scribbler like me. That's a total flight of fancy."

In 2011, Kristof was named one of seven "Top American Leaders" by the Harvard Kennedy School and The Washington Post. "His writing has reshaped the field of opinion journalism", The Washington Post explained in granting the award. That same year, he was elected to the American Philosophical Society. Earlier, in 2007, U.S. News & World Report named Kristof one of "America's Best Leaders".

In 2013, Kristof was awarded the Goldsmith Award for Career Excellence in Journalism by Harvard University. Alex Jones, the Pulitzer Prize-winning director of Harvard Kennedy School of Government's Shorenstein Center, declared in presenting the award that "the reporter who's done more than any other to change the world is Nick Kristof." In the same year, Kristof was named an International Freedom Conductor by the National Underground Railroad Freedom Center, largely for his work exposing human trafficking and linking it to modern slavery. The last person named to receive the title, two years earlier, was the Dalai Lama.

In 2021, the National Academy of Television Arts and Sciences awarded Kristof and The New York Times opinion video team an Emmy award for their video, "Heartache in the Hot Zone: The Front Line Against Covid-19."

== Books ==
External videos
- Booknotes interview with Kristof and WuDunn on China Wakes, October 16, 1994, C-SPAN
- TimesTalks interview with Kristof and WuDunn on Half the Sky, September 15, 2009, C-SPAN
- Presentation by Kristof on A Path Appears, September 26, 2014, C-SPAN,
- After Words interview with Kristof and WuDunn on Tightrope, February 12, 2020, C-SPAN

Kristof has co-authored all his books with his wife WuDunn, include China Wakes: The Struggle for the Soul of a Rising Power (1994), Thunder from the East: Portrait of a Rising Asia (1999), Half the Sky: Turning Oppression into Opportunity for Women Worldwide (Knopf, September 2009), A Path Appears: Transforming Lives, Creating Opportunity (2014) and Tightrope: Americans Reaching for Hope (Knopf, January 2020). A feature documentary for Tightrope was released in 2019. These were all bestsellers.

Kristof explained to Jane Wales of the World Affairs Council of Northern California that the idea for their book Half the Sky was sparked by the 1989 Tiananmen Square protests. After covering the protests, which resulted in some 500 deaths, Kristof and WuDunn were shocked to learn that roughly 39,000 Chinese girls died each year because they were not given the same access to food and medical care as boys. WuDunn and Kristof did not find coverage of these deaths, although they were far more numerous than the casualties at Tiananmen Square. They decided to dig deeper into questions of gender, Kristof said. Half the Sky covers topics such as sex trafficking and forced prostitution, contemporary slavery, gender-based violence, and rape as a weapon of war and method of justice, as it highlights the multitude of ways women are oppressed and violated in the world.

Half the Sky reached No. 1 on the best-seller lists. Carolyn See, an author and book critic of The Washington Post, said in her review:

Half the Sky is a call to arms, a call for help, a call for contributions, but also a call for volunteers. It asks us to open our eyes to this enormous humanitarian issue. It does so with exquisitely crafted prose and sensationally interesting material. ... I really do think this is one of the most important books I have ever reviewed.

A reviewer for The Plain Dealer said: "As Rachel Carson's Silent Spring once catalyzed us to save our birds and be better stewards of our earth, Half the Sky stands to become a classic, spurring us to spare impoverished women these terrors, and elevate them to turn around the future of their nations." The Seattle Times review predicted that Half the Sky may "ignite a grass-roots revolution like the one that eliminated slavery". In CounterPunch, Charles R. Larson declared: "Half the Sky is the most important book that I have read since Rachel Carson's Silent Spring, published in 1962. I am not alone in saying that this is the most significant book that I have ever reviewed." The book was adapted into a documentary in 2012.

== Opinion and stances ==
=== Iraq War ===
Kristof was opposed to the Iraq War and grew further opposed as time went on. In a column published on January 28, 2003, he wrote: "If we were confident that we could oust Saddam with minimal casualties and quickly establish a democratic Iraq, then that would be fine -- and such a happy scenario is conceivable. But it's a mistake to invade countries based on best-case scenarios." He continued, "Frankly, it seems a bad idea to sacrifice our troops' lives -- along with billions of dollars -- in a way that may add to our vulnerability."

Kristof was criticized for reporting that Iraqis opposed an American invasion. Andrew Sullivan was among Kristof's critics but in 2018, on the 15th anniversary of the war, apologized to Kristof in a tweet.

In a column published on August 27, 2002, "Wimps on Iraq", he wrote "To us the existing Iraq debate seems largely beside the point; the real issue isn't whether we want to overthrow Saddam, but what price we would have to pay to get the job done." He concludes, after detailing five practical concerns about invading Iraq, "So if Mr. Bush were really addressing these concerns, weighing them and then concluding that on balance it's worth an invasion, I'd be reassured. But instead it looks as if the president, intoxicated by moral clarity, has decided that whatever the cost, whatever the risks, he will invade Iraq."

In the column "The Day After" in September 2002, Kristof wrote, "In one Shiite city after another, expect battles between rebels and army units, periodic calls for an Iranian-style theocracy, and perhaps a drift toward civil war. For the last few days, I've been traveling in these Shiite cities—Karbala, Najaf and Basra—and the tension in the bazaars is thicker than the dust behind the donkey carts. So before we rush into Iraq, we need to think through what we will do the morning after Saddam is toppled. Do we send in troops to try to seize the mortars and machine guns from the warring factions? Or do we run from civil war, and risk letting Iran cultivate its own puppet regime?"

On May 6, 2003, less than two months into the war, Kristof published the op-ed column "Missing in Action: Truth" in which he questioned whether the intelligence gathered by the Bush administration, which purportedly indicated that Saddam Hussein possessed weapons of mass destruction, was either faked or manipulated. In this article, Kristof cited as his source a "former ambassador" who had traveled to Niger in early 2002 and reported to the Central Intelligence Agency (CIA) and the State Department that the uranium "allegations were unequivocally wrong and based on forged documents". Kristof added, "The envoy's debunking of the forgery was passed around the administration and seemed to be accepted—except that President Bush and the State Department kept citing it anyway."

Two months later, former Ambassador Joseph C. Wilson IV came forward publicly and published a now-famous op-ed in The New York Times, "What I Didn't Find in Africa." This set off a series of events which resulted in what become known as "Plamegate", the disclosure by the journalist Robert Novak of the until-then covert status as a CIA officer of Wilson's wife, Valerie Plame Wilson. A criminal investigation was launched as to the source of the leak, as a consequence of which I. Lewis ("Scooter") Libby, then-Chief of Staff to Vice President Dick Cheney, was indicted on obstruction of justice, false statement, and perjury charges and subsequently convicted and sentenced to 30 months in federal prison and a $250,000 fine though he never served time in prison because President Bush commuted his prison sentence. Kristof's May 6 article was mentioned in the federal indictment of Libby as a key point in time and a contributing factor that caused Libby to inquire about the identity of the "envoy" and later to divulge the secret identity of his wife to reporters.

=== "Grand bargain" with Iran ===
Kristof published several articles criticizing the missed opportunity of the "grand bargain", a proposal by Iran to normalize relations with the United States, implement procedures to assure the US it will not develop nuclear weapons, deny any monetary support to Palestinian resistance groups until they agree to stop targeting civilians, support the Arab Peace Initiative, and ensure full transparency to assuage any US concerns. In return, the Iranians demanded abolition of sanctions and a US statement that Iran does not belong in the so-called "Axis of Evil". In his columns, Kristof revealed the documents detailing the "grand bargain" proposal and argued that it was killed by hardliners in the Bush administration.

According to Kristof, that was an "appalling mistake" since "the Iranian proposal was promising and certainly should have been followed up. It seems diplomatic mismanagement of the highest order for the Bush administration to have rejected that process out of hand, and now to be instead beating the drums of war and considering air strikes on Iranian nuclear sites." Kristof further believes that even if the grand bargain is not currently feasible, there is still an option for what he calls a "mini-bargain", a more modest proposal for normalizing American-Iranian relations.

=== Anthrax attacks columns ===
On October 12, 2001, Times reporter Judith Miller became one of several victims of alleged anthrax attacks. The book Germs: Biological Weapons and America's Secret War, which Miller had co-written with two other Times staffers, had been published ten days earlier on October 2. It became a top New York Times bestseller a few weeks later. Its cover art depicted a white envelope like those used in the anthrax incidents. The text, written before the September 11 attacks, made reference to jihadist terrorists.

In 2002, Kristof wrote a series of columns indirectly suggesting that Steven Hatfill, a former U.S. Army germ-warfare researcher named as a "person of interest" by the FBI might be a "likely culprit" in the anthrax attacks. Hatfill was never charged with any crime. In July 2004, Hatfill sued the Times and Kristof for libel, claiming defamation and intentional infliction of emotional distress. Subsequently, Hatfill voluntarily dismissed Kristof as a defendant in the case when it became clear that the U.S. District Court in Alexandria, Virginia, lacked personal jurisdiction over Kristof. The suit continued against the Times itself but was dismissed in 2004 on the basis that allegations within Kristof's articles did not constitute defamation though they appeared untrue.

The appeals court reversed the lower court ruling in 2005, reinstating Hatfill's suit against the Times. In January 2007, Presiding Judge Claude M. Hilton again dismissed the suit and ruled that Kristof's anthrax articles were "cautiously worded" and asserted that the scientist may perhaps be innocent. Judge Hilton wrote that Kristof "made efforts to avoid implicating his guilt" and that "Mr. Kristof reminded readers to assume plaintiff's innocence." Kristof praised the dismissal of the suit, commenting that he was "really pleased that the judge recognized the importance of this kind of reporting" and that it was "terrific to have a judgment that protects journalism at a time when the press has had a fair number of rulings against it". After the case was dismissed in 2007, the dismissal was upheld by the Appeals Court. In 2008, the case was appealed to the U.S. Supreme Court, which refused to grant certiorari in the case and effectively left the Appeals Court decision in place. The basis for the dismissal was that Hatfill was a "public figure" and had not proved malice on the part of the Times.

=== Sudan and Darfur ===
Kristof is particularly well known for his reporting on Sudan. At the beginning of 2004, he was among the first reporters to visit Darfur and describe "the most vicious ethnic cleansing you've never heard of." He recounted what he called "a campaign of murder, rape and pillage by Sudan" and was among the first to call it genocide. His biography says that he has made 11 trips to the region, some illegally by sneaking in from Chad, and on at least one occasion, he was detained at a checkpoint when the authorities seized his interpreter and Kristof refused to leave him behind.

Kristof's reporting from Sudan has been both praised and criticized. Robert DeVecchi, past president of the International Rescue Committee, told the Council on Foreign Relations: "Nicholas Kristof... had an unprecedented impact in single-handedly mobilizing world attention to this crisis. There are undoubtedly hundreds of thousands of refugees in and from the Darfur region who owe their very lives to this formidable humanitarian and journalist." New York Magazine said that Kristof "single-handedly focused the world's attention on Darfur", and the Save Darfur Coalition said that "he is the person most responsible for getting this issue into America's consciousness and the resulting efforts to resolve it." Samantha Power, the author of A Problem from Hell: America and the Age of Genocide, the Pulitzer Prize-winning book on genocide, told an American Jewish World Service audience that Kristof was probably the person the Janjaweed militia in Darfur most wanted to kill. In June 2008, the actress Mia Farrow spoke as Kristof was honored with the Anne Frank Award by declaring: "Nick Kristof was one of the first to publicly insist that the words Never Again mean something for the people of Darfur. For his courage and his conviction in telling tell searing truths, he is the voice of our collective conscience, demanding we bear witness to the first genocide of the 21st century and encouraging us not to sit by while innocents die. Every once in a great while a moral giant appears among us. Nicholas Kristof is that person." For his coverage of Darfur, Ann Curry of NBC suggested that Kristof was "the modern journalist who showed courage and leadership comparable to the great Edward R. Murrow."

On the other hand, some commentators have criticized Kristof for focusing on atrocities by Arab militias in Darfur and downplaying atrocities by non-Arab militias. A book by Mahmood Mamdani of Columbia University, Saviors and Survivors, criticized Kristof's reporting for oversimplifying a complex historically-rooted conflict and packaging it as "genocide". Others, including some critical of Sudan, have sometimes made similar arguments. The Sudanese government has also objected that Kristof's reporting exaggerates the scale of suffering and ignores the nuances of tribal conflicts in Darfur. The Sudan government and pro-government news media criticized him in March 2012 for sneaking into Sudan's Nuba Mountains region without a visa to report on hunger and bombings there by saying that his illegal entry was "shameful and improper".

More broadly, Kristof's critics have accused him of promoting a "white knight" or "white savior" complex, where his journalism and activism are framed in a way that centers Western interventions as the solution to global problems, rather than empowering local communities to address their own issues. This approach, some argue, reinforces harmful stereotypes and undermines the agency of those Kristof aims to represent.

=== Criticism of anti-sweatshop movement ===
Nicholas Kristof argues that sweatshops are, if not a good thing, defensible as a way for workers to improve their lives and for impoverished countries to transform themselves into industrial economies. In his argument, sweatshops are an unpleasant but necessary stage in industrial development. Kristof is critical of the way "well-meaning American university students regularly campaign against sweatshops", particularly the anti-sweatshop movement's strategy of encouraging consumer boycotts against sweatshop-produced imports. Kristof and WuDunn counter that the sweatshop model is a primary reason that Taiwan and South Korea, which accepted sweatshops as the price of development, are today modern countries with low rates of infant mortality and high levels of education, but India, which has generally resisted sweatshops, suffers from a high rate of infant mortality. Kristof and WuDunn admit that sweatshop labor is grueling and dangerous but argue that it is an improvement over most alternatives in extremely poor countries by providing much-needed jobs and boosting economies. They caution that anti-sweatshop boycott campaigns could lead to the closing down of manufacturing and processing plants in places like Africa, where they are needed most. "This is not to praise sweatshops", they admit:

Some managers are brutal in the way they house workers in firetraps, expose children to dangerous chemicals, deny bathroom breaks, demand sexual favors, force people to work double shifts or dismiss anyone who tries to organize a union. Agitation for improved safety conditions can be helpful, just as it was in 19th-century Europe. But Asian workers would be aghast at the idea of American consumers boycotting certain toys or clothing in protest. The simplest way to help the poorest Asians would be to buy more from sweatshops, not less.

=== Israeli–Palestinian conflict ===
Kristof supports Israeli and US negotiation with Hamas as a means to resolve the Israeli–Palestinian conflict. He criticizes Israel for its collective punishment of Gazans and holds that the lack of negotiations only strengthens extremists. He also advocates removing Israeli settlements from Hebron since "the financial cost is mind-boggling, and the diplomatic cost is greater". Kristof contrasts "two Israels": an oppressive security state in the Palestinian territories and a "paragon of justice, decency, fairness – and peace", in the work of Israeli human rights activists, journalists, and jurists.

==== "The Silence That Meets the Rape of Palestinians" ====
On May 11, 2026, The New York Times published an opinion article by Kristof titled "The Silence That Meets the Rape of Palestinians" in which he recounts interviews detailing alleged widespread sexual abuse committed by Israeli prison guards, soldiers, settlers and interrogators against Palestinians, especially those in Israeli custody. The 3,700-word article cited reports on sexual and gender-based violence against Palestinians during the Gaza war from the United Nations Commission on Human Rights, the Euro-Mediterranean Human Rights Monitor, the Committee to Protect Journalists, and B'Tselem. Kristof also relied on direct interviews with 14 Palestinians, including the journalist Sami al-Sai and nonviolence activist Issa Amro, who reported having been sexually assaulted by Israeli settlers or members of Israeli forces.

In response, Israeli Prime Minister Benjamin Netanyahu and his foreign minister Gideon Sa'ar published a statement saying The New York Times had published "one of the most hideous and distorted lies ever published against the State of Israel in the modern press" and that they had ordered the "initiation of a defamation lawsuit". The New York Times said this legal action was "without merit". In a post on X, formerly Twitter, the Israeli Ministry of Foreign Affairs called the article "Hamas propaganda" and "one of the worst blood libels ever to appear in the modern press". The Israeli Ministry of Foreign Affairs has alleged that Kristof was a "propagandist" who was "part of a false and well-orchestrated anti-Israel campaign aimed at placing Israel on the UN Secretary-General's blacklist". A spokesperson for The New York Times published a statement in support of Kristof, commending his reporting and source verification process. Kristof subsequently called on Israel to permit Red Cross and lawyer visits to Palestinian security detainees.

The piece elicited strong reactions, including protest outside The New York Times Building on May 14. Some Israelis including Yuli Novak and Omer Bartov said the use of sexual violence against Palestinians in Israeli custody was already well known in Israel. Critics from The Free Press, the Jewish Telegraphic Agency, The Wall Street Journal, and The Times of Israel focused on Kristof's citation of a report by the Euro-Mediterranean Human Rights Monitor which Israel has alleged to be "Hamas-linked", testimonies from sources kept anonymous, and the implausibility of dog rape. Other critics in sources such as Al Jazeera English, Zeteo, and Middle East Eye criticized the publication of the story in the opinion section while the 2023 story "Screams Without Words" about sexual and gender-based violence in the October 7 attacks was published as news, which they connected to allegations of a double standard with regard to coverage of the Israeli–Palestinian conflict in The New York Times.

=== Libya ===
During the 2011 Libyan civil war, Kristof remarked that the US should create a no-fly zone and also use military aircraft to jam Libyan state communications: "let's remember the risks of inaction – and not psych ourselves out. For crying out loud!"

=== US government ===
In a column published in The New York Times on June 15, 2011, Kristof argued that the US military was a prime example of how a comprehensive social safety net, universal health care, a commitment to public service, low income disparity, and structured planning could be made to work within an organization. He then suggested that the military could serve as a model for improving American society along those lines. This brought criticism from several other commentators, who argued that the military is effective at what it does only by severely limiting the freedom of its members. Jonah Goldberg argued, "You've got to love how a system that requires total loyalty, curbs free speech, free association, freedom of movement, etc., is now either 'lefty' or 'liberal' because it gives 'free' healthcare and daycare", and he hinted that the ideas in Kristof's column resembled fascism. David French added, "If you want to see the military do what it does best, then ride out on a mission with an armored cavalry squadron. If you want to see the military struggle to do its job well, then I suggest you spend some time with its social services."

=== Education reform ===
In a 2021 New York Times essay, Kristof wrote that he favors education reform more than teachers' unions do. He suggests that unions sometimes encourage teachers to accept low wages in return for job security. Instead, Kristof advocates that teachers give up some protections in exchange for receiving much higher average starting salaries. He says that despite his disagreements with unions on some issues, "I roll my eyes" at what he calls a conservative narrative that unions are the fundamental problem in K-12 education. States with the best schools, like Massachusetts, have strong teachers' unions, while those with the worst education outcomes, like South Carolina, have weak or non-existent unions, he wrote.

=== Flame retardants and chemical reform ===
Kristof has written several articles on the controversial use of flame retardants in furniture, most recently in the November 2013 piece "Danger Lurks in that Mickey Mouse Couch". Kristof argues that legislative mandates of flame retardants in furniture are a result of powerfully-influential lobbyists representing the chemical industry. He claims that flame retardants are ineffective in saving lives but pose an increasingly evident public health risk to both families and firefighters. In his words, "These flame retardants represent a dizzying corporate scandal. It's a story of corporate greed, deceit and skulduggery."

In 2012, Kristof went as far as to write that flame retardants in furniture are "a case study of everything that is wrong with money politics". He concluded the article "Are You Safe On That Sofa?" by arguing that the United States needs not only safer couches but also a political system less distorted by what he calls "toxic money".

Kristof's stances on flame retardants have come under fire from the chemical industry, which calls his op-eds "overdramatic" and "misleading".

=== Child pornography and nonconsensual pornography ===
On December 4, 2020, Kristof published a lengthy look at the website Pornhub and at its parent company, MindGeek. Kristof examined how Pornhub routinely has pornographic content on its site involving minors, and he wrote about how Pornhub's reviewers often have to make judgment calls on whether the user-submitted pornographic videos feature underage performers and whether the videos depict individuals engaging in nonconsensual sex. Kristof's article included interviews with underage victims who have appeared in videos on Pornhub that were submitted by people who filmed them, in some cases while being raped, and he reported that several such victims had attempted suicide. Pornhub denied Kristof's claims by calling them "irresponsible and flagrantly untrue". Kristof implored political leaders in Canada, where MindGeek is based, to consider why Canada hosts a website that profits off videos featuring rape and children. In response, on December 4 Canada Prime Minister Justin Trudeau told reporters outside his residence: "We are always extremely concerned with gender-based violence, with exploitation of minors, with child pornography."

After MasterCard, Visa, and Discover banned payments to MindGeek-owned sites based on Kristof's report, several commentators argued that Kristof's solution impacted the many legal consensual sex workers who rely on MindGeek sites for income. Sex Workers Outreach Project USA provided a statement on December 11, 2020 that asserted that "the damage they do does not impact the labor as much as it affects the laborers who depend on the Pornhub platform to earn a living. Because of this decision, based on fiction and conflated reports regarding the presence of minors being assaulted on its platform, many sex workers will be forced even further into the margins." Sarah T. Roberts described the campaign targeting Pornhub as "strangely punitive and uniquely puritanical in an American way."

In a follow-up article on April 16, 2021, "Why Do We Let Corporations Profit From Rape Videos", Kristof provided an update and shared the story of a woman in Alberta who had been drugged and raped by her ex-husband, who later posted a video of the assault on Pornhub. The video was viewed by more than 200,000 people, and in her interview with Kristof, the woman shared she had attempted suicide. "How do you get your head around 200,000 guys masturbating as you're being assaulted?" she said.

Kristof also addressed some of the concerns raised by pro-sex work activists that he was anti-pornography. He remarked that "a starting point is to recognize that the issue is not pornography but child abuse and exploitation. We can be sex positive and exploitation negative."

=== Japan ===
Kristof served as The New York Times Tokyo bureau chief between 1995 and 1999.

One of Kristof's articles questioned Japanese claims on the Senkaku Islands, prompting objections and protests from Japanese officials, who contested the idea that the islands were seized from China in 1895 as spoils of war.

=== Political party ===
Kristof is a self-described progressive and a registered member of the Democratic Party. In 1974, a front-page article in the News-Register reported on Kristof's activism in Democratic politics throughout high school with the headline "Nicholas Gets into Politics Early". He has attributed many of his progressive views to his mother, Jane Kristof, who formerly served as treasurer of the Yamhill County Democratic Central Committee and currently serves as both her precinct committee-person and the coordinator of the Yamhill County Democratic Think Tank. In 2011, President Barack Obama hosted Kristof and his wife, Sheryl WuDunn, at the State Dinner for Hu Jintao.

== Win-a-Trip with Nick Kristof contest ==
In 2006, The New York Times launched the Win a Trip with Nick Kristof contest, offering a college student the opportunity to win a reporting trip to Africa with Kristof by submitting essays outlining what they intend to accomplish in such a trip. From among 3,800 students who submitted entries, Kristof chose Casey Parks of Jackson, Mississippi. In September 2006, Kristof and Parks traveled to Equatorial Guinea, Cameroon, and the Central African Republic and reported on AIDS, poverty, and maternal mortality. During the trip, Kristof published his New York Times columns while Parks wrote about her observations in her blog.

The success of this partnership prompted the Times to hold the Second Annual Win A Trip with Nick Kristof contest in 2007. Leana Wen, a medical student at Washington University in St. Louis, and Will Okun, a teacher at Westside Alternative High School in Chicago, were the winners of the 2007 competition. During summer 2007, they traveled with Kristof to Rwanda, Burundi, and eastern Congo. Filmmaker Eric Daniel Metzgar joined Kristof, Wen and Okun on their trip. The resulting film, Reporter, premiered at the 2009 Sundance Film Festival and aired on HBO in February 2010. In reviewing the film, which was executive produced by Ben Affleck, Entertainment Weekly wrote: "In Reporter, he's a compelling figure, a cross between Mother Teresa and the James Woods character in Salvador, and what seals the intensity of his job is the danger." The Washington Post observed, "Ideally, [Kristof] hopes to teach his companions, who won a contest to travel with him, about the value of witnessing the world's atrocities and scintillating [sic] them into stories that will call on people to act. Which is what Kristof did with his work in Darfur, Sudan: He caused people – from George Clooney on down – to do whatever they can."

Since 2010, the Center for Global Development has screened applicants for the contest, forwarding Kristof a short list of finalists for his selection. In March 2018 Kristof traveled again to the Central African Republic accompanied by Tyler Pager, the former editor of The Daily Northwestern and the winner of that year's contest. The co-director of Columbia University's Human Rights Institute, Sarah Knuckey, described Kristof's reporting of the Central African Republic resulting from this trip as "shallow" and "reckless".

== Personal life ==
Kristof married Sheryl WuDunn, a third-generation Chinese American, in 1988. They have three children. In 2018, Kristof and his wife began converting his family's cherry orchard in Yamhill, Oregon, to a cider apple orchard and vineyard.

In 2020, Westchester Magazine described Kristof and his wife as "Scarsdale residents". In 2022, Kristof told Willamette Week that "[t]he plan is to continue to base myself on the farm here in Yamhill, but spend a week every month or two in New York", as part of his obligations as a columnist for The New York Times.

== See also ==
- List of people from Oregon

== Bibliography ==
- Kristof, Nicholas D.; WuDunn, Sheryl (February 23, 2001). Thunder from the East. Knopf Doubleday Publishing Group. ISBN 978-0-375-41269-1.
- Kristof, Nicholas D.; WuDunn, Sheryl (September 8, 2009). Half the Sky. Knopf Doubleday Publishing Group. ISBN 978-0-307-27315-4.
- Kristof, Nicholas D.; WuDunn, Sheryl (October 12, 2011). China Wakes: The Struggle for the Soul of a Rising Power. Knopf Doubleday Publishing Group. ISBN 978-0-307-76423-2.
- Kristof, Nicholas D.; WuDunn, Sheryl (September 23, 2014). A Path Appears: Transforming Lives, Creating Opportunity. Knopf Doubleday Publishing Group. ISBN 978-0-385-34992-5.
- Kristof, Nicholas D.; WuDunn, Sheryl (January 14, 2020). Tightrope: Americans Reaching for Hope. Knopf Doubleday Publishing Group. ISBN 9780525655091.
