= Yamhill Carlton High School =

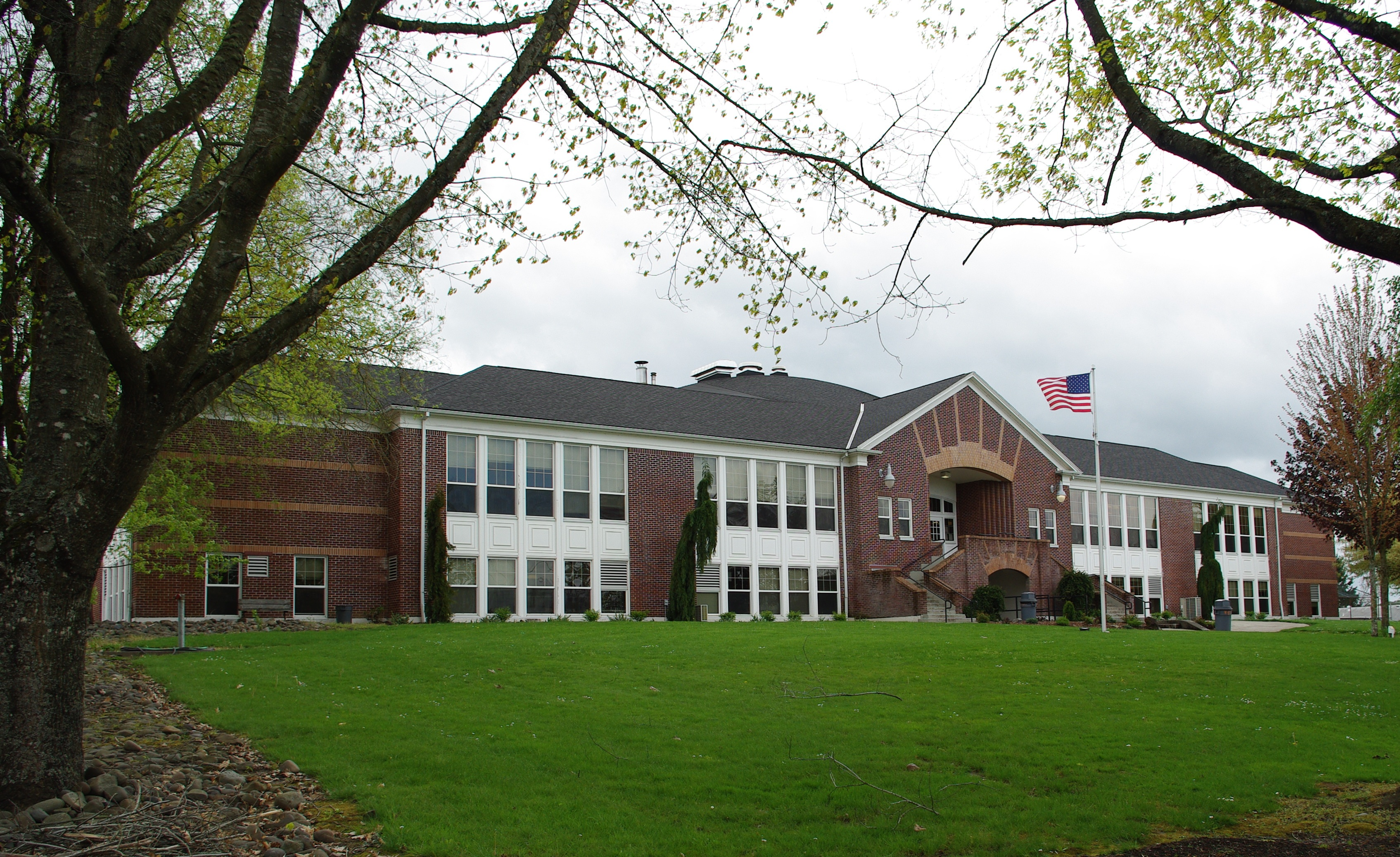

Location
- 275 North Maple Street; Yamhill, (Yamhill County), Oregon 97148; United States; 45.343°N 123.187°W

Information
- Type: Public
- School district: Yamhill-Carlton School District
- Principal: Tanner Smith
- Teaching staff: 18.26 (FTE)
- Grades: 9–12
- Enrollment: 285 (2021-2022)
- Student to teacher ratio: 15.61
- Colors: Beaver Orange and Black
- Athletics conference: OSAA 3A-2 Costal Range League
- Mascot: Tiger
- Team name: Tigers
- Rival: Blanchet Catholic School
- Website: hs.ycsd.k12.or.us

Yamhill-Carlton High School (YCHS) is a public high school in the northwest United States, located in Yamhill, Oregon, southwest of Portland.

== History ==
The school was built in the 1930s and was to cost $65,000, with the Public Works Administration providing $27,000 towards the project.

== Academics ==
In 2014, 71% of the school's seniors received a high school diploma. Out of 89 students, 11 dropped out. 34.6% of all students missed more than 10% of school days.

In 2022, 66% of the school's seniors received a high school diploma. Of 67 students, 46 graduated and 26 dropped out.

== Athletics ==
Yamhill-Carlton High School athletic teams compete in the OSAA 3A-2 Costal Range League (excluding Football and Boys Wrestling which compete in 3A-SD1.) The athletic secretary is Ally Rigamonti.

State championships:

- Boys Basketball: 1992
- Cheerleading: 2024
- Girls Basketball: 1976

== Notable alumni ==
- Nicholas Kristof, Pulitzer Prize winning columnist of The New York Times
- James B. Thayer, U.S. army general and businessman
