= Sheryl WuDunn =

American business executive, writer, lecturer, and Pulitzer Prize winner

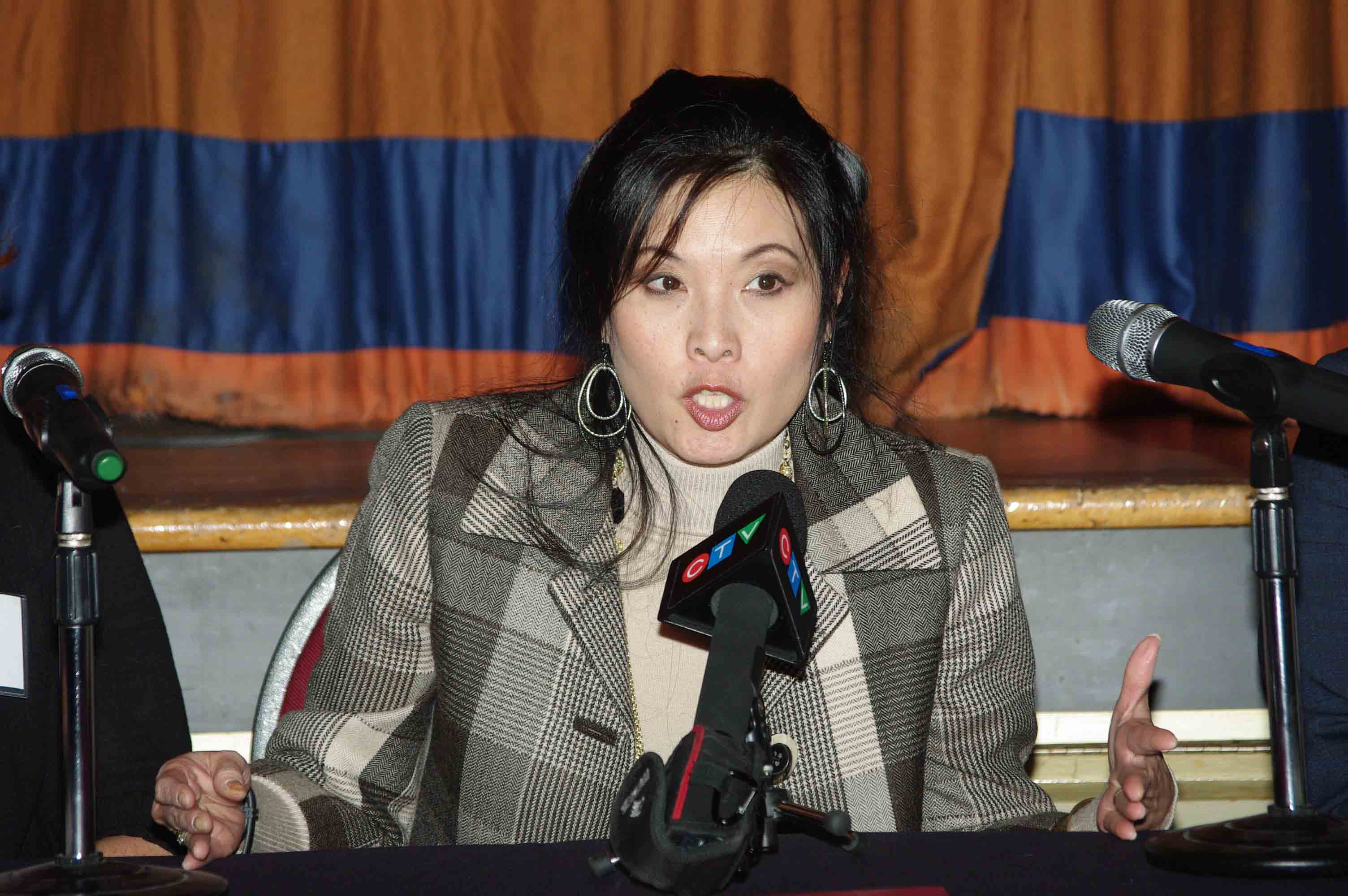
- WuDunn in October 2012
- Born: November 16, 1959 (age 66); New York City, U.S.
- Education: Cornell University (BA); Harvard University (MBA); Princeton University (MPA)
- Occupations: Writer; journalist; lecturer; business executive
- Spouse: Nicholas D. Kristof (m. 1988)

Sheryl WuDunn
- Traditional Chinese: 伍潔芳
- Simplified Chinese: 伍洁芳
Transcriptions
Standard Mandarin
- Hanyu Pinyin: Wǔ Jiéfāng
- Wade–Giles: Wu^{3} Chieh^{2} Fang^{1}
Yue: Cantonese
- Jyutping: Ng5 Git3 Fong1

Sheryl WuDunn (Chinese: 伍洁芳; pinyin: Wǔ Jiéfāng; born November 16, 1959) is an American journalist, writer, and Pulitzer Prize winner.

A senior banker focusing on growth companies in technology, new media and the emerging markets, WuDunn also works with double bottom line firms, alternative energy issues, and women entrepreneurs. She has also been a private wealth adviser with Goldman Sachs and was previously a journalist and business executive for The New York Times, where she served as a foreign correspondent in the Beijing and Tokyo bureaus.

== Biography ==
A third generation Chinese American, Sheryl WuDunn grew up in New York City on the Upper West Side of Manhattan. She graduated from Cornell University with a Bachelor of Arts in European history in 1981. For three years, WuDunn worked for Bankers Trust Company as an international loan officer. She then earned an M.B.A. from Harvard Business School and an M.P.A. at Princeton University from the Woodrow Wilson School of Public and International Affairs.

WuDunn married reporter Nicholas Kristof in 1988. After working for The Wall Street Journal and other publications, WuDunn joined the staff of The New York Times as a correspondent in the Beijing bureau in 1989.

WuDunn worked for a time for Goldman Sachs as a vice president in its investment management division as a private wealth advisor, before leaving to write a book.

WuDunn and her husband Kristof won the Pulitzer Prize for International Reporting in 1990 for their coverage of the Tiananmen Square protests of 1989. They were the first married couple ever to win a Pulitzer for journalism; WuDunn was the first female Asian-American reporter to win a Pulitzer. She also won a George Polk Award and an Overseas Press Club award, both for reporting in China.

In 2009, WuDunn and Kristof received the Dayton Literary Peace Prize's 2009 Lifetime Achievement Award. In 2011, WuDunn was listed by Newsweek as one of the 150 Women who Shake the World.

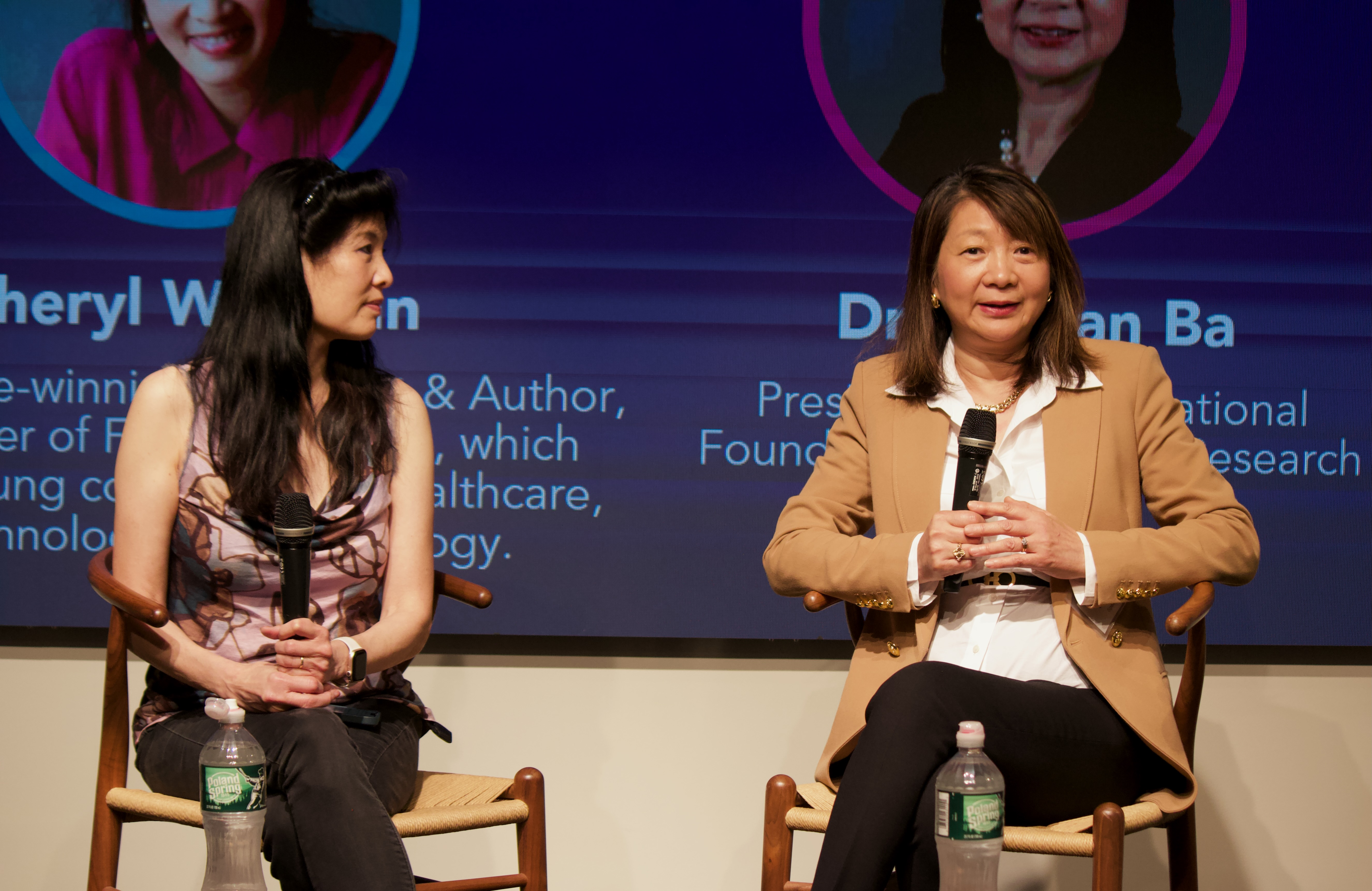
WuDunn and Sujuan Ba at Serica Trailblazers 2025

In 2012, WuDunn was selected as one of 60 notable members of the League of Extraordinary Women by Fast Company magazine. In 2013, she was included as one of the leading "women who make America" in the PBS documentary "The Makers". She was also featured in a 2013 Harvard Business School film about prominent women who have graduated from the business school. In August 2015, Business Insider named her one of the 31 most prominent graduates of the Harvard Business School.

In 2015 she signed an open letter which the ONE Campaign had been collecting signatures for; the letter was addressed to Angela Merkel and Nkosazana Dlamini-Zuma, urging them to focus on women as they serve as the head of the G7 in Germany and the AU in South Africa respectively, which will start to set the priorities in development funding before a main UN summit in September 2015 that will establish new development goals for the generation.

== Books ==
WuDunn has co-authored five best-sellers with her husband. China Wakes: The Struggle for the Soul of a Rising Power and Thunder from the East: Portrait of a Rising Asia are non-fiction Asian studies books which examine the cultural, social, and political situation of East Asia largely through interviews and personal experiences. Her third best-selling book was Half the Sky: Turning Oppression into Opportunity for Women Worldwide, and WuDunn later was featured in the PBS documentary made of the book. Half the Sky was adapted into a Facebook game that aimed to raise awareness about women's issues globally. Her fourth best-seller, A Path Appears: Transforming Lives, Creating Opportunity, published in 2014, is a guide to effective charitable giving and making a difference in addressing global challenges. It was turned into a PBS documentary, featuring Jennifer Garner, Eva Longoria, Alfre Woodard, Blake Lively, in early 2015. Tightrope: Americans Reaching for Hope, published in 2020, was also a New York Times best seller.

== Boards ==
WuDunn served for more than a decade on the Cornell University board of trustees, including as a member of the board's finance committee and investment committee. Initially appointed to the Cornell board by the university president, she was later reappointed by the New York governor and served under two governors. She also served for many years on the advisory council of the Woodrow Wilson School of Public and International Affairs at Princeton University and in 2013 was elected by alumni to the Princeton University board of trustees. She currently serves on the board of advisors for Fuel Freedom Foundation. WuDunn is also on the advisory boards of a number of start-up companies in a variety of fields, including healthcare and mobile security.

== Bibliography ==
- Nicholas D. Kristof; Sheryl WuDunn (12 October 2011). China Wakes: The Struggle for the Soul of a Rising Power. Knopf Doubleday Publishing Group. ISBN 978-0-307-76423-2.
- Nicholas D. Kristof; Sheryl WuDunn (23 February 2001). Thunder from the East. Knopf Doubleday Publishing Group. ISBN 978-0-375-41269-1.
- Nicholas D. Kristof; Sheryl WuDunn (8 September 2009). Half the Sky. Knopf Doubleday Publishing Group. ISBN 978-0-307-27315-4.
- Nicholas D. Kristof; Sheryl WuDunn (23 September 2014). A Path Appears: Transforming Lives, Creating Opportunity. Knopf Doubleday Publishing Group. ISBN 978-0-385-34992-5.
- Nicholas D. Kristof; Sheryl WuDunn (14 January 2020). Tightrope: Americans Reaching for Hope. Knopf Doubleday Publishing Group. ISBN 9780525655091.
