= Eric Daniel Metzgar =

American film director

Eric Daniel Metzgar (1974-), photographed in 2008.

Eric Daniel Metzgar is a filmmaker who lives and works in San Francisco.

== Career ==
=== Documentary filmmaking ===
Metzgar's documentary titled Reporter (2009) chronicles New York Times journalist Nick Kristof's 2007 voyage to the Democratic Republic of Congo. The film includes an interview with former Congolese rebel leader Laurent Nkunda and other key players in the Congolese power struggle. Reporter premiered at the 2009 Sundance Film Festival. It was broadcast on HBO and nominated for an Emmy Award in the category of "Outstanding Informational Programming -- Long Form". He shot and edited the film as well. Actor Ben Affleck was one of a few producers.

Metzgar's second documentary film, Life. Support. Music., premiered at the 2008 Full Frame Documentary Film Festival. Life. Support. Music. tells the story of Jason Crigler, a New York-based guitarist who in 2004 suffered a brain injury, and tracks his recovery. The film features interviews with Norah Jones, Marshall Crenshaw, Teddy Thompson and others. Life. Support. Music. won many awards on the film festival circuit, including the Enel Cuore Award for Best Social Documentary at the 2008 Rome International Film Festival, and the Audience Choice award at the 2008 Independent Film Festival of Boston. The film was broadcast as part of the P.O.V. series on PBS. Metzgar edited and shot the film as well.

Metzgar's debut film, a documentary entitled The Chances of the World Changing, which he directed, produced, shot and edited, premiered at the 2006 Full Frame Documentary Film Festival. The film documents two years in the life of Richard Ogust, a man struggling to save over a thousand endangered turtles and tortoises from extinction. The Chances of the World Changing screened at film festivals, won several awards and was nominated for a 2007 Independent Spirit Award in the "Axium Truer than Fiction" category. It also aired on PBS as part of the P.O.V. series in 2007.

=== Editing and producing ===
Metzgar edited and executive produced Give Up Tomorrow, directed by Michael Collins and produced by Marty Syjuco. Give Up Tomorrow won the Audience Choice Award at the 2011 Tribeca Film Festival. It also won a Special Jury Prize at the festival for Best New Director and was nominated for an Emmy Award for Best Investigative Journalism in 2013. The film also won the Audience Choice Award at the 2011 Sheffield Doc/Fest. The film was broadcast on POV in 2012.

Metzgar produced and edited Crime + Punishment (directed by Stephen Maing). The film tracks whistleblower cops in the NYPD. It premiered at the 2018 Sundance Film Festival, winning the Grand Jury Award for “Social Impact". The film was broadcast on Hulu and won an Emmy Award for “Outstanding Social Issue Documentary". The film made the “shortlist” for the Academy Awards.

Metzgar co-edited Mayor with director David Osit. The film follows Mousa Hadid, the Christian mayor of Ramallah in Palestine, during his second term in office. The film premiered at the 2020 True/False Film Festival. It was named one of the best films of 2020 by The New York Times, IndieWire, The Boston Globe, Vulture, Paste, Vox and The Playlist.

=== Short films ===
Metzgar also directed, shot and edited A Film about Animals (for my children to watch when they are older), a short documentary about the illegal wildlife trade in Cambodia. The film won Best Short at the International Wildlife Film Festival, Best Short at the Planet in Focus Environmental Film Festival, and Best Short at the Animal Film Festival.

In 2008, Metzgar completed a short first-person documentary titled Beholder, as part of the International Documentary Challenge. The film won the Documentary Challenge's "Original Vision Award," and also won "Best Writing" and "Best Use of First Person".

=== Other work ===
Metzgar also writes screenplays and directs music videos. In 2015, Metzgar completed his fictional feature debut, titled "For the Coyotes," which he wrote and directed. The film stars James Carpenter and Josh Schell.
