= Cancer survivor =

Person with cancer who is still alive

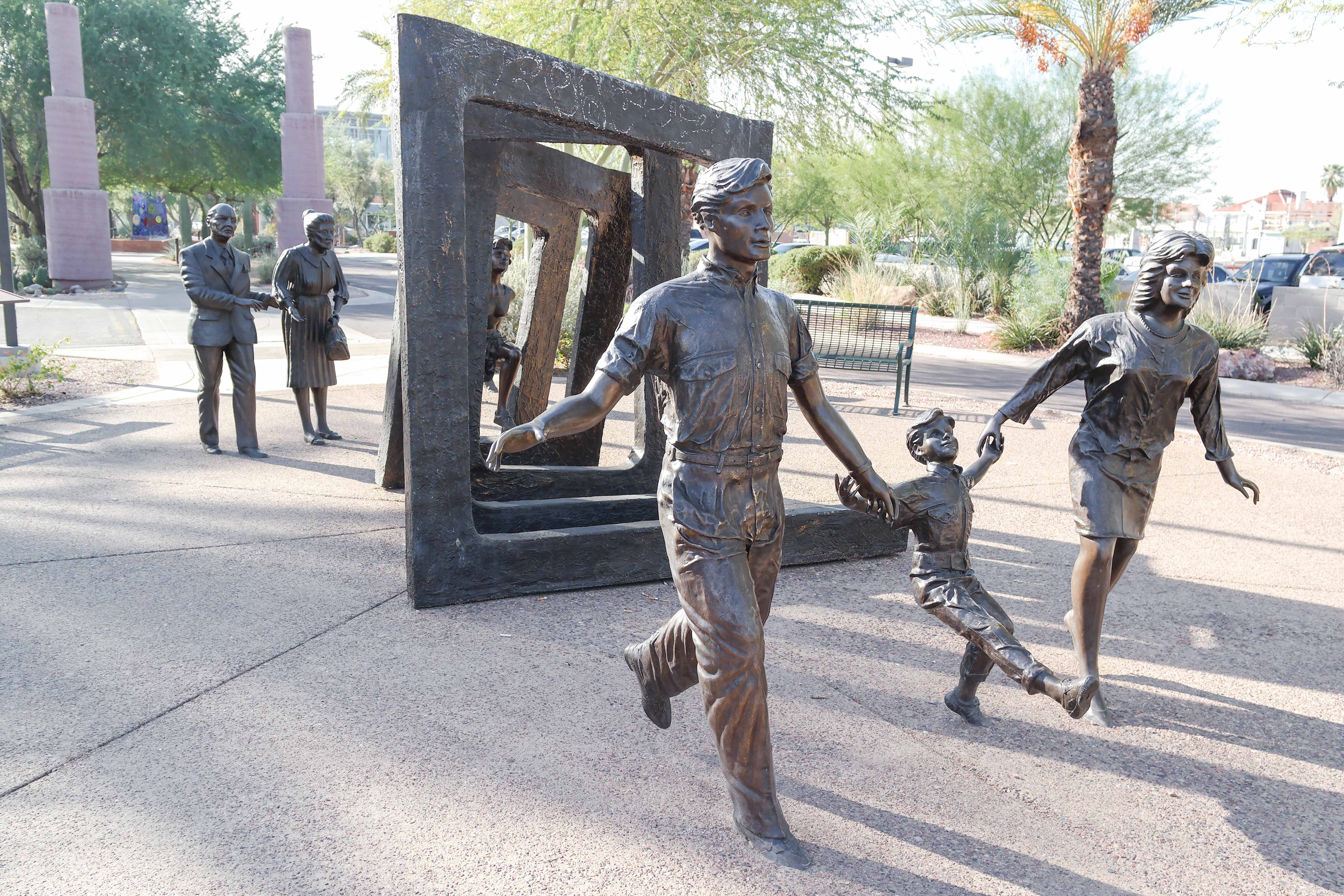
Sculpture in a park with a theme of cancer survivorship

A cancer survivor is a person with or beyond cancer of any type who is still living. Whether a person becomes a survivor at the time of diagnosis or after completing treatment, whether people who are actively dying are considered survivors, and whether healthy friends and family members of the cancer patient are also considered survivors, varies from group to group. Some people who have been diagnosed with cancer reject the term survivor or disagree with some definitions of it.

How many people are cancer survivors depends on the definition used. Nearly 65% of adults diagnosed with cancer in the developed world are expected to live at least five years after the cancer is discovered. In the U.S. for example, about 17 million Americans alive today—one in 20 people–are either currently undergoing treatment for cancer or have done so in the past (up from 11 million, or one in thirty people, in 2009). Globally, about 45 million people, mostly from wealthier countries, have survived cancer for at least five years.

For many people, surviving cancer can be highly traumatic and it is not uncommon for people to experience psychological distress such as post-traumatic stress-disorder or symptoms of post-traumatic-stress. Some cancer survivors describe the process of living with and beating cancer as a life-changing experience and some people who survive cancer may use the experience as opportunities for creative self-transformation into a "better person" or as motivation to meet goals of great personal importance, such as climbing a mountain or reconciling with an estranged family member. This process of post-traumatic growth is called benefit finding. Cancer survivors often have specific medical and non-medical needs related to their cancer experience.

== Definitions and alternatives ==
Macmillan Cancer Support in the UK defines a cancer survivor as someone who is "living with or beyond cancer", namely someone who:

- has completed initial cancer management and has no apparent evidence of active disease;
- is living with progressive disease and may be receiving cancer treatment, but is not in the terminal phases of illness;
- or has had cancer in the past.

The National Coalition for Cancer Survivorship (NCCS) pioneered the definition of survivor as being any person diagnosed with cancer, from the time of initial diagnosis until their death. This definition of survivor includes people who are dying from untreatable cancer. NCCS later expanded the definition of survivor even further to include family, friends and voluntary caregivers who are "impacted by the survivorship experience" in any way. Part of the goal in promoting survivorship was to stop using the older, more discouraging label cancer victim.

The US National Cancer Institute's Office of Cancer Survivorship uses a definition that focuses on identifying people with a medical history that includes any form of cancer, regardless of their self-identification with the word survivor.

The word survivor is a loaded term. Using the blanket term to label a diverse group is problematic, and many former cancer patients reject the term. Within the breast cancer culture, survivorship is conferred upon women who are perceived as having had emotional or physical trauma, even if their breast cancer was a non-life-threatening pre-cancerous condition like LCIS or DCIS. The term tends to erase and degrade people who are dying of incurable cancer. This idea of survivorship emphasizes and values longevity of life after diagnosis, while overlooking issues of quality of life.

Some people reject the term survivor as being a narrow conceptualization of highly variable human experiences. Alternatives include alivers and thrivers, which put emphasis on living as well as possible, despite limitations and disability. A third term, the diers, is used by some terminally ill patients who reject the claim that dying is part of survivorship or should be covered up with inappropriately optimistic language.

The term previvor has been used to describe unaffected carriers. Unaffected carriers, or previvors, are those who have not been diagnosed with cancer, but who know that they are likely to develop cancer due to certain genetic mutations that form a known cancer syndrome. They have survived the predisposition, or higher risk, of cancer. As such, this is the first generation in human history who, armed with information about a predisposition to a cancer after opting into DNA testing, can make informed choices prior to cancer diagnosis. The typical previvor has tested positive for a BRCA mutation, learned that she is at high risk for developing breast cancer and ovarian cancer, or he is at high risk of developing prostate or male breast cancer, and is attempting to manage that risk through a combination of increased surveillance through mammograms, breast MRIs, pelvic ultrasounds, oophorectomy, bilateral mastectomy, PSA testing, MRI, and other medical procedures. There has been controversy over the term previvor, because the name compares these healthy women to people who have already been diagnosed with cancer.

== Needs of cancer survivors ==
People who have finished cancer treatment often have psychological and physical medical challenges. These effects can vary from person to person, change over time, and range in intensity from mild and intermittent to fully disabling. Different cancers and different treatments cause different long-term side effects. Problems commonly include fatigue, pain, sleep problems, physical side effects like lymphoedema, weight gain, anxiety and depression, fear of cancer recurrence, impacted sexual desire and or function, and impaired quality of life.

=== Psychosocial ===
==== Returning to life ====
If the treatment is lengthy and disruptive, many patients experience some difficulty in returning to normal daily life. The energy needed to cope with a rigorous treatment program may have caused them to disconnect from previous daily patterns, such as working, normal self-care, and housekeeping. Some survivors become dependent on the attention and sympathy that they received during their treatment and feel neglected when life returns to normal. There are tremendous implications that cancer has on the relationships that survivors have with their loved ones (particularly their partners) once their cancer has been treated, and social support plays a critical role in their long-term emotional adjustment.

Cancer survivors tend to be more resilient than the general population.

==== Ongoing effects ====
Some survivors have to adjust to the idea that they will never be cured.

Some survivors, even if the cancer has been permanently cured, struggle emotionally from the trauma of having experienced a life-threatening disease. Cancer survivors experience more psychological distress than those who have never had cancer (5.6% compared to 3.0%). Serious psychological distress was seen 40% more among cancer survivors of five years or more than in those who have never had cancer. About 10% develop major depressive disorder; others experience an adjustment disorder. In young adult cancer survivors, one small study found that 20% of participants met the full clinical diagnosis of post-traumatic stress disorder (PTSD), and 45% to 95% displayed at least one symptom of PTSD. The NCCN has developed a distress thermometer scale for measuring overall distress in cancer survivors.

Survivors of adult cancer are at an increased risk of suicidal ideation (having thoughts about suicide), while as many as 13% of childhood cancer survivors experience suicidal ideation. Issues of pain and physical ailments have been hypothesized as major contributing factors in cancer survivors experiencing this suicidal ideation.

==== Fear of cancer recurrence ====
People whose cancer is in remission may still have to cope with the uncertainty that at any time their cancer could return without warning. After the initial treatment has ended, anxiety is more common among cancer survivors than among other people. This anxiety regarding the cancer's return is referred to as fear of cancer recurrence. Many patients are anxious that any minor symptom indicates that the cancer has returned, with as many as 9 in 10 patients fearful that their cancer will recur or spread. In addition to the appearance of any new aches and pains, common triggers for a fear that the cancer may return include hearing that someone else has been diagnosed with cancer, annual medical exams to determine whether the cancer recurred, and news stories about cancer. This anxiety leads to more medical check ups, which can be measured even after a period of up to ten years. This fear can have a significant effect on individuals' lives, resulting in difficulties in their daily life such as work and socialising, and difficulties planning for the future. Overall, fear of cancer recurrence is related to a reduced quality of life in cancer survivors.

This fear is not unwarranted, as both pediatric and adult survivors have a higher than average risk of another cancer (a new cancer, sometimes called a second primary), in addition to the possibility that the original cancer could recur. These new cancers may have been caused by genetic predisposition, by the treatment for the first cancer, or by ordinary risk factors for cancer. Some risk factors, such as smoking, drinking alcohol, overeating, and lack of physical activity, may be things the cancer survivor can modify, with a consequent reduction in the chance of a second cancer.

While fear of cancer recurrence can be adaptive at low levels (e.g., by prompting the person to get appropriate screening tests done), high levels of fear require psychological treatment. As of 2012, there are no psychometrically sound measures of this fear, which makes research into the effectiveness of treatment protocols difficult to interpret. Treatments that are being investigated include: cognitive-behavioural therapy, meta-cognitive therapy, cognitive-existential group therapy, mindfulness-based interventions, and physical exercise.

==== Financial effects ====
Cancer survivors and their families have often incurred significant expenses or had to forego the opportunity to work regularly during treatment and recovery. When treatment ends, they may be partially or fully disabled, either temporarily or permanently. They may have ongoing costs, such as expensive medications to prevent recurrence or address side effects. As a result, they may experience financial distress. Adult survivors of childhood cancer are twice as likely to be unemployed than healthy controls. The risk of unemployment depends on cancer diagnosis, with survivors of CNS and brain tumors being nearly 5 times more likely to be unemployed, whereas the risk for survivors of blood or bone cancer was found to be elevated but not significantly higher.

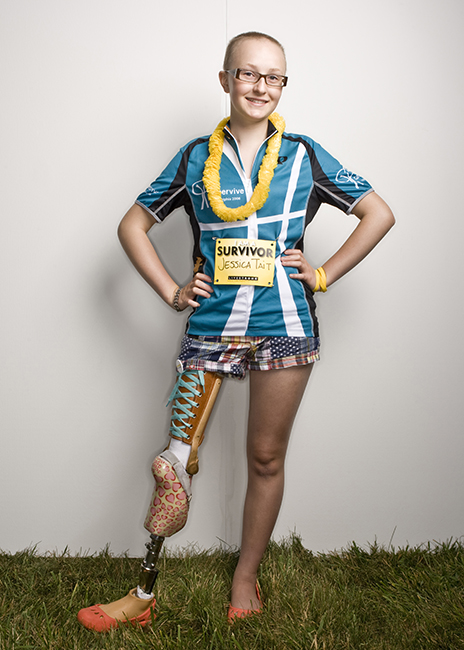
Cancer survivor Jessica Tait in 2008

==== Survivorship ====
The cultural ideal of a survivor may add to individual patients' distress if the patient is unable or unwilling to live up to the ideal. As described by Gayle Sulik in her book Pink Ribbon Blues: How Breast Cancer Culture Undermines Women's Health, the ideal survivor is bravely committed to mainstream medicine and optimistic or even certain of a physical cure. She (Note: Sulik was writing specifically about women survivors of breast cancer.) is open about diagnosis and treatment and become an educated, empowered medical consumer. The ideal survivor, like a superwoman who simultaneously manages her home, family, and career, struggles valiantly to prevent cancer from affecting loved ones by appearing, behaving, and working as much as possible. Once the immediate crisis is past, the person may feel strongly pressured to donate time, money, and energy to cancer-related organizations. Above all, the ideal survivor does not die of cancer. People who publicly conform to this ideal are given social status and respect.

=== Physical ===
In terms of medical challenges, some survivors experience cancer-related fatigue, may have long-term side effects from cancer and its treatment, and may need extensive rehabilitation for mobility and function if aggressive surgery was required to remove the cancer. They may experience temporary or persistent post-chemotherapy cognitive impairment. Some young survivors lose their ability to have children.

=== Medical monitoring ===
Cancer survivors frequently need medical monitoring, and some treatments for unrelated diseases in the future may be contraindicated. For example, a patient who has had a significant amount of radiation therapy may not be a good candidate for more radiation treatments in the future. To assist with these needs, survivor care plans have been promoted. These are personalized documents that describe the person's diagnosis and treatment in detail, list common known side effects, and specifically outline the steps that the survivor should take in the future, ranging from maintaining a healthy weight to receiving specific medical tests on a stated schedule. However, these are not widely used, as they have been expensive and complicated to produce.

Medical tests to determine whether the cancer has returned commonly provoke fears. Informally, this is called scanxiety, a portmanteau of scan and anxiety. A desire to avoid feeling this fear can prompt survivors to postpone or refuse tests. This may be able to be helped by the follow-up of people who have had cancer post-treatment being undertaken via self-reported patient-related outcome measures rather than follow-up visits, but there is not enough controlled research looking into this.

Different health systems use different approaches to long-term medical monitoring. In the UK, the risk-stratified shared care model predominates. This means that cancer survivors at low risk of future problems will be monitored mainly by the primary care provider, according to medical guidelines. Those at medium risk might be seen by the primary care provider one year, and then the oncologist the next year. Those at high risk are followed by the oncologist alone. Specialty centers may use a nurse-led model, in which survivors are followed by a nurse, often one who specializes in a particular type of cancer. Large centers may have a multi-disciplinary model, in which a team made up of providers in different specialties work together to meet all of the cancer survivor's needs in the same clinic. Another model, for cancer survivors with high health literacy, is self management, in which the cancer survivor knows what to do, which symptoms require medical advice, and how to obtain help when it is needed.

== Pediatric survivors ==
Survivors of childhood cancer have a life expectancy up to 28% shorter than people in the general population. Therefore, there is a need to closely monitor these patients for much longer than usual. The Children's Oncology Group recommends that monitoring should include periodic follow-up and screening by a clinician familiar with these patients' risks. Improving these patients' longevity requires recognition and treatment of illnesses associated with late effects in the decades after therapy for childhood cancer. For example, survivors of childhood cancer may have more difficulty than typical with breastfeeding and require more support to undertake this health-promoting activity. Childhood cancer survivors are also at risk for developing kidney diseases. Others experience various forms of heart disease, particularly those exposed to anthracyclines or chest radiotherapy.

One challenge to achieving this goal is that childhood cancer survivors are both very adaptable and accustomed to denying difficulties; as a result, they tend to minimize their symptoms. Therefore, internists may not give them all the attention they need and thus the actual help they may need. Symptom management, health promotion, specific attention to psychosocial needs, and surveillance for recurrence and specific late effects of treatment are helpful. Health behaviour interventions may be able to reduce the impact of some of the chronic issues cancer survivors face by improving their dietary intake. Likewise, physical exercise training interventions may have positive effects on physical fitness, including cardio-respiratory fitness, muscle strength and health-related quality of life.

== Adolescent and young adult survivors ==
Adolescent and young adult (AYA) survivors, often defined as being between the ages of 15 and 39, have seen advancements in technology and modern medicine causing a dramatic increase in the number of AYA survivors. Prior to 1970, childhood cancer was considered a universally fatal disease. From 1995 to 2000, however, the 5-year survival rate for children diagnosed with cancer was 80%. Significant progress has been built in the last 25 years as there are now approximately 270,000 survivors of pediatric cancer in the U.S., which translates to approximately 1 in every 640 young adults being a survivor of childhood cancer. However, as studies have shown, as patient needs increase, the likelihood of having an unmet need also increases. For the AYA population, 2 out of 3 childhood cancer survivors will develop a complication due to the therapy they received, and 1 out of 3 will develop serious or life-threatening complications, meaning they will need treatment and follow-up care. In addition, AYAs may experience greater difficulties adhering to treatment, which may negatively impact future outcomes.

An AYA survivor faces a variety of issues as a result of their cancer diagnosis and treatment that are unique to their particular age group which differentiate their survivor population from the adult survivor population. For example, AYA survivors report that their education, employment, sexual functioning, marriage, fertility, and other life values are impacted by their cancer. Compared to adult survivors, AYA survivors have a much greater risk of getting a second primary malignancy as a side effect of the treatment for their original diagnosis. It is believed that AYAs have a much higher relative risk of developing a second primary cancer because the intensity of the treatment for their original diagnosis, typically including any combination of chemotherapy, surgery, and radiation therapy, is much higher than the level of intensity given to patients over 40. Furthermore, since AYA survivors are diagnosed and treated at such a young age, their length of time as a survivor is much longer than their adult counterparts, making it more likely they will face a second primary cancer in their lifetime.

=== Barriers to quality long-term follow-up care ===
Childhood cancer survivors, in particular, need comprehensive long-term follow-up care to thrive. One way this can be accomplished is through continuous follow-up care with a primary care physician who is trained to identify possible late effects from previous treatments and therapies.

The Children's Oncology Group (COG) has designed a set of survivorship guidelines that hope to aid both health care professionals and survivors themselves, in both the intricacies and basics of long-term follow-up care. The COG recommends that patients or their families put together their own treatment summary, so they can have their treatment history with them when they visit any health care provider. The COG suggests that all survivors include the following in their treatment summaries:

- Name of disease, date of diagnosis, stage of disease, contact information of all clinics and hospitals where care was received
- Names and doses of any chemotherapy received
- Names and doses of any radiation received, and the area of the body that was radiated
- Names and dates of all surgeries
- For people receiving a transplant, the type of transplant, where it was received, and whether chronic graft-versus-host disease developed
- Names and dates of any significant complications and treatment received for those complications

With the treatment summary, experts hope that survivors will be better equipped to maintain quality follow-up care long after their original treatment. This is especially important for the AYA population, in particular, because they are typically facing major social changes regarding their relationship status, employment or education status, their insurance coverage, and even their place of residence, etc. Typically, most of these factors are stable for most older adults, and when they experience any changes, it would usually occur in one or two aspects of their life at a time. However, with people under the age of 40 is when most people undergo the most change. This reality underscores the importance of a smooth transition from child-centered to adult-focused health care services through which they are consistently managed.

=== Impact of Affordable Care Act on the AYA survivor population ===
The US Affordable Care Act (ACA) in 2010 makes it illegal for health insurance providers to deny coverage for a pre-existing condition, such as previously having survived cancer. Young adults are required to have health insurance coverage and, with a few exceptions, will be able to be covered under their parent's coverage until the age of 26 as a dependent in their parent's plan.

== Care ==
Studies among endometrial cancer survivors show that satisfaction with information provided about the disease and treatment increases the quality of life, lowers depression and results in less anxiety. People who receive information on paper, compared to oral, indicate that they receive more information and are more satisfied about the information provided. The US Institute of Medicine and the Dutch Health Council recommend the use of a written "survivorship care plan", which is a summary of a patient's course of treatment, with recommendations for subsequent surveillance, management of late effects, and strategies for health promotion.

Cancer survivors are encouraged to meet the same guidelines for physical activity as the rest of the population. However, less than one-third of US cancer survivors met the Physical Activity Guideline for Americans. Increased physical activity reduces both all-cause and cancer-specific mortality in breast and colorectal cancer survivors as well as all cancer survivors. In addition, sedentary behaviors, particularly prolonged sitting, were associated with worse survival outcomes. Physical activity improves quality of life among a range of cancer survivors and may also assist with cancer-related fatigue and common co-morbidities.

Diet can also impact long-term mortality, with evidence across various cancer types.

However, adherence to diet and exercise recommendations among cancer survivors is often poor.

Digital behaviour change interventions can be successful at increasing physical activity and may also help with diet in cancer survivors.

In breast cancer survivors, home-based multidimensional survivorship programmes have short-term beneficial impacts on quality of life and can reduce anxiety, fatigue and insomnia. Mindfulness-based survivorship programs may be an effective way to improve the mental health of cancer survivors.

== Family members ==
Family members can be significantly affected by the cancer experience of their loved ones. They may need to be assessed and treated as a result of the emotional and mental strain. For parents of children with cancer, finishing treatment can be a particularly vulnerable time. In the post-treatment period, some parents may experience increases in anxiety, depression and feelings of helplessness. A sub-group of parents report post-traumatic stress symptoms up to years after treatment completion. Evidence-based psychological interventions tailored to the needs of parents of childhood cancer survivors may assist parents in resuming their normal lives after their child has finished treatment.

Spouses of cancer survivors are more likely than other people to experience anxiety in the years after their partner's successful treatment. Being married reduces the cancer survivor's risk of developing post-traumatic stress disorder or other psychological difficulties, but it increases the risk of the spouse developing mental health symptoms.

== Epidemiology ==
As of 2019, about 17 million people living in the US have previously been diagnosed with cancer. By 2030, that number is expected to increase to 22 million.

Globally, about 45 million people have survived cancer for at least five years. Most of these cancer survivors are from wealthier countries. In the US, about 70% of people survive cancer for at least five years after diagnosis, and almost half will live for ten or more years. About 20% of cancer survivors have lived 20 or more years past their diagnosis.

Cancer survivors by age
Age
0 to 64
Age
65 to 80
Age
>80

Because cancer is much more common in older adults, most cancer survivors are older adults. Within the US, about 35% of cancer survivors are children, teenagers, or working-age adults. About 45% of cancer survivors are between the ages of 65 and 80, and about 20% are older than that.

Cancer survivors are more likely to be women. In the US, overall, there is survival difference of about six percentage points between white and Black cancer survivors, though this varies significantly according to the type of cancer.

== History ==
The idea of cancer survivorship being part of cancer-related care can be traced back to two events. One was the gradual realization that survivors of childhood cancer had some specific, long-term care needs. The other was a 1985 essay written by a physician who was diagnosed with cancer at the age of 32, in which he described his experiences as belonging to three phases, which he called acute survival (active treatment), extended survival (recovering from cancer and its treatment), and eventually permanent survival (the long-term social, psychological, and physical effects on the cancer survivor and their loved ones). The partnership that grew out of that publication became the National Coalition of Cancer Survivorship. The National Cancer Institute's Office of Cancer Survivorship was created in 1995.

== See also ==
- Learning problems in childhood cancer
- Psycho-oncology
