= Mayor (film) =

- Film poster
- Directed by: David Osit
- Produced by: David Osit
- Starring: Musa Hadid
- Cinematography: David Osit
- Edited by: David Osit & Eric Daniel Metzgar
- Production companies: Rosewater Pictures; Rise Films; Fork Films; Bertha Doc Society; Tribeca Film Institute
- Release date: March 5, 2020 (True/False Film Festival)
- Running time: 89 minutes
- Countries: United States; United Kingdom
- Languages: Palestinian Arabic; English

Mayor (Arabic: العمدة, romanized: al-ʿUmda) is a 2020 documentary film produced and directed by David Osit. The film follows Musa Hadid, the mayor of Ramallah, the de facto capital of Palestine, for two years.

== Release ==
Mayor premiered in March 2020 at the True/False Film Fest, one of the last film festivals to proceed as scheduled in the first half of 2020 due to the Coronavirus pandemic. The film was acquired by Film Movement for theatrical distribution in North America, beginning at Film Forum on December 2, and was released online on the Criterion Channel and video on demand platforms in early 2021. The film was subsequently a recipient of a 2022 Peabody Award.

== Reception ==
On review aggregator Rotten Tomatoes, the film holds an approval rating of 100% based on 42 reviews. The site's critical consensus reads, "A clear-eyed look at an extraordinary subject, Mayor makes essential viewing out of one politician's quest to preserve dignity in the midst of bureaucracy." In his Critic's Pick review for Indiewire Eric Kohn writes "There have been countless documentaries made about the West Bank experience, from “5 Broken Cameras” to “The Settlers,” and they often involve the travails of ordinary life existing side by side with military persecution. “Mayor” offers a striking new perspective on that struggle, with a personal on-the-ground quality matched by grand tonal ambitions that makes it the best of its subgenre."

Tomris Laffley of Variety writes "Osit brings a respectful approach that admirably never registers as observations of a patronizing Westerner", and called the film "astonishing" and "sharply witty".

Many reviews praised the film's use of dark comedy; in his Critic's Pick review for The New York Times Ben Kenigsberg calls the film "surprisingly funny", Stephen Saito of Movable Fest writes that the film often resembles "a lost season of Veep" and Mary McNamara of Los Angeles Times describes the film as both "troubling and hilarious". Alissa Wilkinson of Vox wrote "At times, it plays like Veep — if the characters in Veep were actually kind, compassionate, and oriented toward what best serves the public’s interest. But Mayor also shows how challenging the job of mayor is, even for a talented leader like Hadid, who struggles to show the world what the citizens of his city are facing as they, and he, go about their lives under impossible and seemingly intractable circumstances."

== Awards ==
Award	Category	Recipient(s)	Result
Copenhagen International Documentary Festival	NEXT:WAVE Award	David Osit	Won
Full Frame Documentary Film Festival	Reva and David Logan Grand Jury Award	Mayor	Won
Port Townsend Film Festival	Best Documentary Award	Mayor	Won
Boston Palestine Film Festival	Audience Award - Best Documentary Feature	Mayor	Won
Philadelphia Film Festival	Honorable Mention	Mayor	Won
Philadelphia Film Festival	Best Documentary	Mayor	Nominated
Cinema Eye Honors	Unforgettables	Musa Hadid	Won
Cinema Eye Honors	Spotlight Award	Mayor	Nominated
Peabody Awards	Documentary	Mayor	Won
News & Documentary Emmy Awards	Outstanding Government & Politics Documentary	Mayor	Won
Cinema for Peace awards	Award for The Political Film of the Year	Mayor	Won

=== Lists ===
Mayor in best-of lists
Critic/Publication	List	Rank	Ref.
Indiewire	The Best Movies of 2020	16	
Indiewire	The Best Documentaries of 2020	Placed	
The Boston Globe	Best Documentaries of 2020	Placed	
Vulture	The Best Movies Of 2020	10	
Paste	The 25 Best Documentaries Of 2020	Placed	
Vox	The Best Movies of 2020	2	
Hammer To Nail	Hammer To Nail's Best Movies of 2020	Placed	
Polygon	The Best Documentaries of 2020	9	
