= Through the Night (2020 film) =

- Directed by: Loira Limbal
- Edited by: Malika Zouhali-Worrall
- Music by: Osei Essed
- Release date: 2020
- Country: United States
- Language: English

Through the Night is a 2020 American documentary film. It depicts the lives of an owner of a 24/7 children’s daycare and three working mothers who bring their children there.

The film premiered at the 2020 BlackStar Film Festival, where it was nominated for Best Feature Documentary. It later aired as part of POV on PBS on May 10, 2021.

== Reception ==
On the review aggregator website Rotten Tomatoes, 100% of 19 critics' reviews are positive, with an average rating of 7.9/10.

Peter Sobczynski of RogerEbert.com gave the film three out of four stars and wrote, "Through the Night starts off as an inspirational documentary about a woman who diligently performs the kind of service whose very existence may not have even occurred to some people, but which has proven to be a godsend to others. On that level, the film works well enough as like an extended version of a feel-good item you might have seen on the news back in those long-ago times when "slow news days" were a thing. However, as Loira Limbal's film goes on, a second and altogether deeper narrative begins to emerge, as the film becomes a quiet, unsparing indictment of the long-standing failures of America's social safety net, and how people like the central character here go to extraordinary lengths to fill holes in the system that the government either cannot or will not fix."
