= Predators (2025 film) =

2025 American documentary film

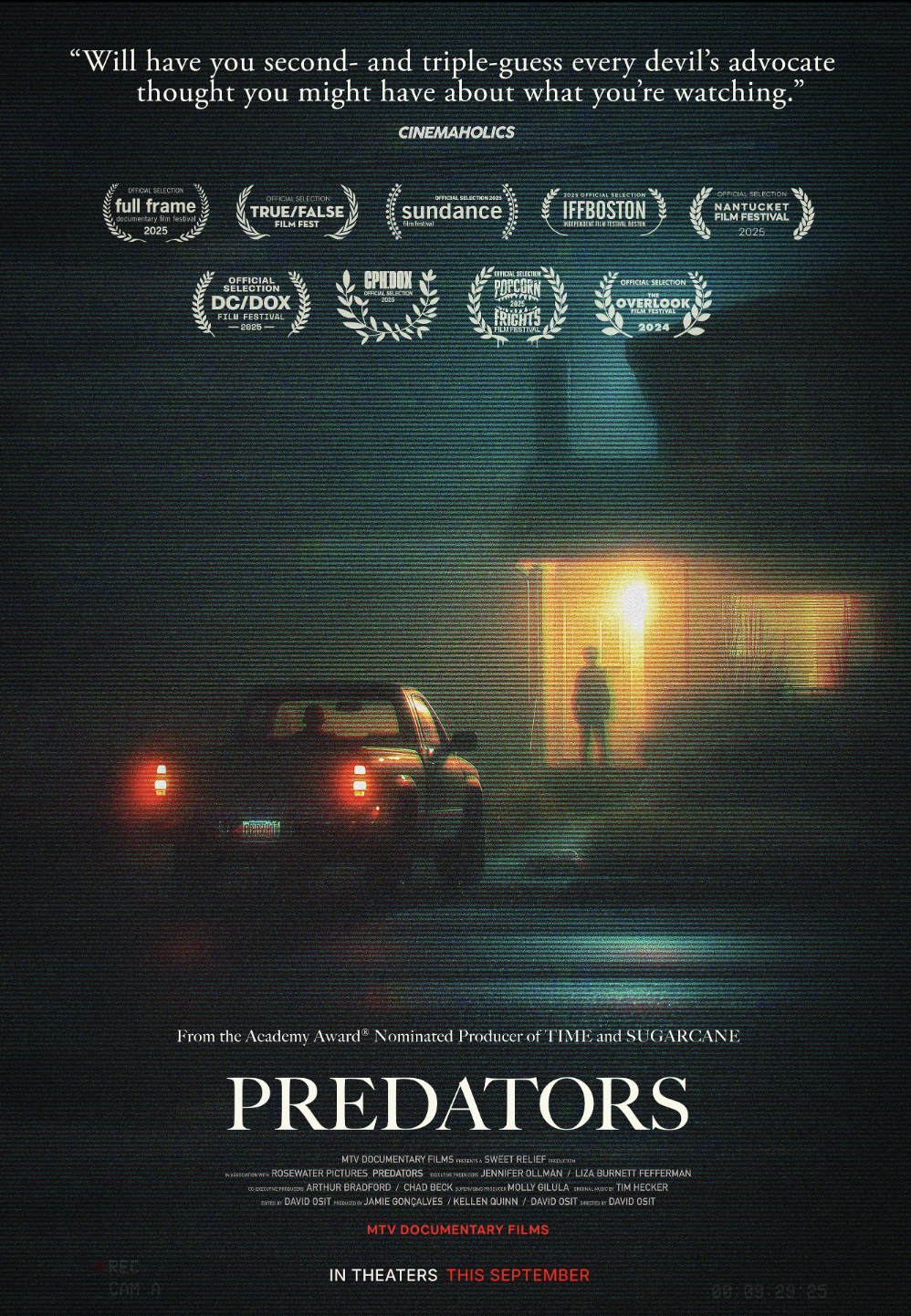
- Directed by: David Osit
- Produced by: Kellen Quinn; Jamie Gonçalves; David Osit
- Cinematography: David Osit
- Edited by: David Osit; Nicolás Nørgaard Staffolani
- Music by: Tim Hecker
- Production companies: Sweet Relief Productions; Rosewater Pictures
- Distributed by: MTV Documentary Films
- Release dates: January 25, 2025 (Sundance); September 19, 2025 (United States)
- Running time: 96 minutes
- Country: United States
- Language: English
- Box office: $61,252

Predators is a 2025 American documentary film produced and directed by David Osit. It follows the rise and fall of the reality television program To Catch a Predator, which aired on NBC from 2004 to 2007.

The film had its world premiere at the U.S. Documentary Competition of 2025 Sundance Film Festival on January 25. It was theatrically released on September 19, 2025, by MTV Documentary Films.

== Premise ==
The documentary film explores the rise and fall of the reality television program To Catch a Predator, which aired on NBC from 2004 to 2007 featuring interviews with some of the former decoys, clips and unseen raw footage from the series (alongside other archival footage featuring Jimmy Kimmel, Oprah Winfrey and Jon Stewart praising the show's impact on popular culture) and an interview with host Chris Hansen.

== Production ==
David Osit wanted to make a documentary revolving around To Catch a Predator after finding a fan community on Reddit, which included raw and unaired footage. Osit additionally wanted to explore copycat versions of the show made by other people.

== Release ==
The film had its world premiere at the Sundance Film Festival on January 25, 2025, where it was cited as one of the best films of the festival by numerous publications including IndieWire, Vanity Fair, Variety and Rolling Stone.

In March 2025, MTV Documentary Films acquired distribution rights to the film. It was released on September 19, 2025,

In November 2025, Paramount+ announced it would begin streaming the film worldwide starting December 8.

== Reception ==
=== Critical response ===
Predators received positive reviews from film critics, and has been cited as one of the year's best documentaries. On the review aggregator website Rotten Tomatoes, 97% of 78 critics' reviews are positive, with an average rating of 7.8/10. The website's consensus reads: "A searing and intellectually rigorous documentary, Predators examines the motives behind public justice to reveal the disturbing ethical consequences of turning real life trauma into spectacle." Metacritic, which uses a weighted average, assigned the film a score of 83 out of 100, based on 19 critics, indicating "universal acclaim".

In his Critic's Pick review for IndieWire, David Ehrlich referred to the film as "raw and riveting", and Variety critic Guy Lodge wrote, "Osit's brilliant, subtly needling film leaves us unnerved and alert, but not certain of our convictions – an outcome, perhaps, that more true-crime programming should pursue." It was also listed as a New York Times Critic's Pick.

Lance Oppenheim, director of the 2026 film Primetime that dramatizes the production of To Catch a Predator, consulted with and sought advice from Osit during postproduction due to his work on Predators, earning Osit a "special thanks" credit on the film.

=== Accolades ===
Predators was nominated for a Peabody Award and a News and Documentary Emmy Award for Outstanding Investigative Documentary.

=== Lists ===
Predators in end-of-year lists
| Critic/Publication | List | Rank | Ref. |
|---|---|---|---|
| Indiewire | The Best Movies of 2025 | 18 | |
| Indiewire | The Best Documentaries of 2025 | Placed | |
| The New York Times | Best Films of 2025 | 6 | |
| ScreenCrush | The Best Movies of 2025 | 5 | |
| The Guardian | The 50 Best Movies of 2025 | 14 | |
| Little White Lies | The 30 Best Films of 2025 | 21 | |
| Film Comment | Best Films of 2025 | 9 | |

== See also ==
- Primetime – 2026 film starring Robert Pattinson as Chris Hansen that dramatizes the production of To Catch a Predator
- Criticism of reality television
