= David Osit =

American filmmaker (born 1987)

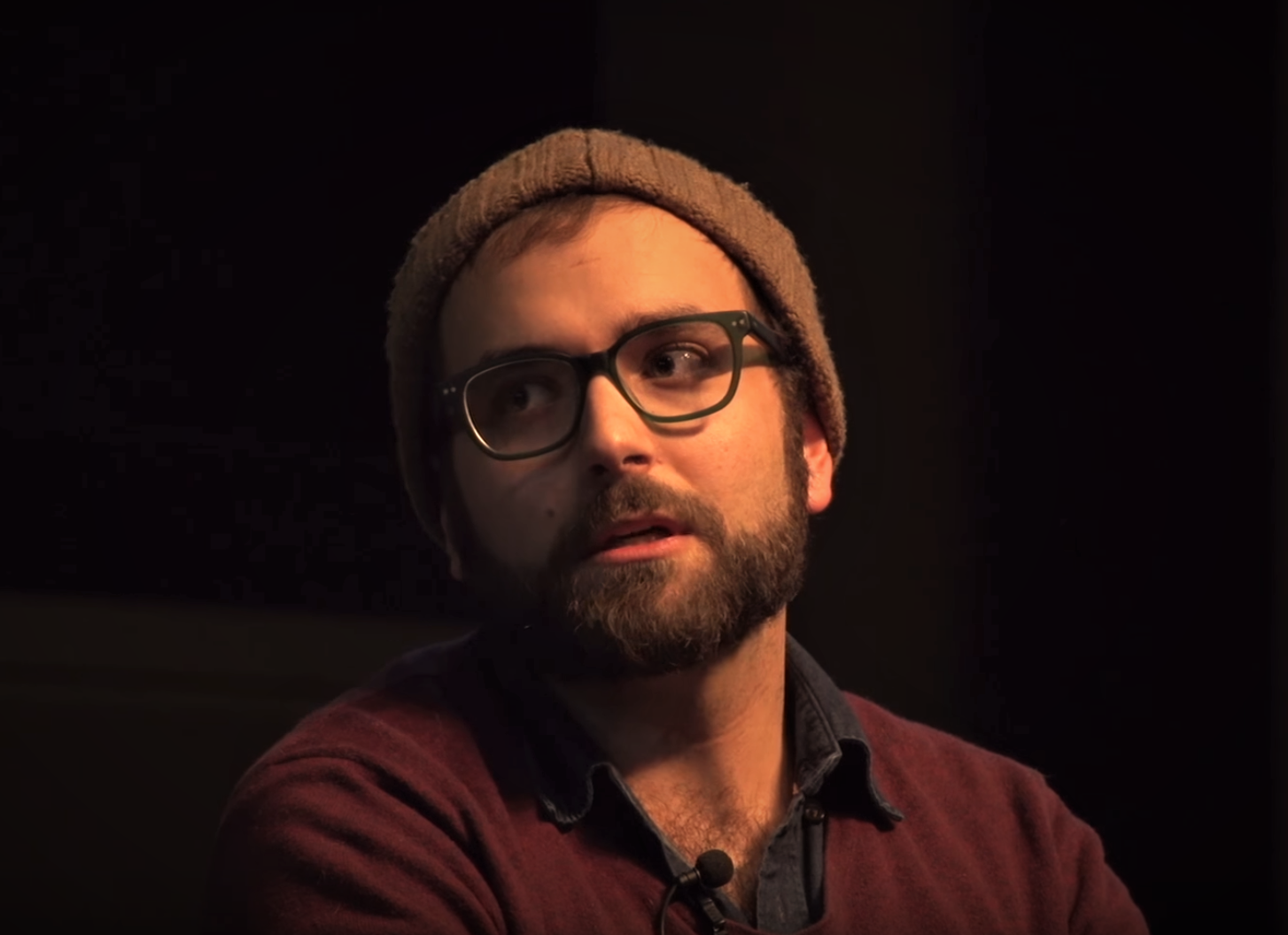
- David Osit, photographed in 2017
- Born: May 6, 1987 (age 39)
- Occupations: Documentary filmmaker, editor, composer
- Known for: Thank You For Playing, Mayor, Predators

David Osit (born May 6, 1987) is an American documentary filmmaker, editor and composer. His documentaries include Predators (2025), Mayor (2020), and Thank You for Playing (2015).

== Life and career ==
Osit was raised in the suburbs of New York City in Tuckahoe (village), New York, where he graduated from Tuckahoe High School in 2005. Osit studied Middle Eastern and North African Studies at the University of Michigan where he was a Wallenberg Fellow, and studied Refugee Law at the American University in Cairo. His first documentary film, Building Babel, was filmed while Osit was in graduate school and followed real estate developer Sharif El-Gamal during the 2010 Ground Zero Mosque controversy. The film was broadcast on PBS in 2013.

He is the director, along with co-director Malika Zouhali-Worrall, of the 2015 documentary Thank You for Playing. Osit and Zouhali-Worrall also directed "Games You Can't Win," a short film inspired by the feature for The New York Times Op-Docs. Both the feature and short were inspired by the art house video game That Dragon, Cancer. In 2017, Thank You for Playing won an Emmy Award for Outstanding Arts and Culture Documentary.

His third feature documentary, Mayor, follows Musa Hadid, the mayor of Ramallah, the de facto capital of Palestine. The film premiered at the True/False Film Festival in 2020, one of the last film festivals to proceed as scheduled in the first half of 2020 due to the Coronavirus pandemic. It was theatrically released on December 2, 2020, to critical praise. The film was a New York Times "Critic's Pick" and an Indiewire "Critic's Pick", and won an Emmy Award for Outstanding Politics & Government Documentary, and a 2022 Peabody Award.

His fourth feature documentary Predators premiered at the Sundance Film Festival and was acquired by MTV Documentary Films and Paramount+ for theatrical and worldwide release. The film was a New York Times "Critic's Pick" and IndieWire "Critic's Pick", and was frequently cited as one of the best documentaries of 2025.

Osit has edited and composed for numerous documentary films and television shows, including Live From New York!, which was the opening night film of the 2015 Tribeca Film Festival, and The Vow. He has cited his experience editing true crime television shows as part of the inspiration for making Predators.

He was named to the 2020 Doc NYC "40 Under 40" list.

== Influences ==
Osit has cited Roy Andersson, Elia Suleiman, Miloš Forman and Amir Naderi as influences on his work. He has referred to James Longley's Iraq in Fragments as a formative documentary for his generation of documentary filmmakers.

== Filmography ==
Year	Film	Director	Producer	Editor	Cinematographer	Composer
2012	Building Babel	Yes	Yes	Yes	Yes	Yes
2015	Live from New York!	No	No	Yes	No	No
2015	Thank You For Playing	Yes	Yes	Yes	Yes	Yes
2017	No Man's Land	No	Yes	Yes	No	Yes
2020	The Vow	No	No	Yes	No	No
2020	Mayor	Yes	Yes	Yes	Yes	Yes
2022	Hostages	No	No	Yes	No	No
2024	The Antisocial Network	No	No	Yes	No	No
2025	Predators	Yes	Yes	Yes	Yes	No
