= That Dragon, Cancer =

2016 video game

- Developer: Numinous Games
- Publisher: Numinous Games
- Designer: Ryan Green
- Programmer: Josh Larson
- Writer: Amy Green
- Composer: Jon Hillman
- Engine: Unity
- Platforms: Microsoft Windows, OS X, Ouya, iOS, Android
- Release: Windows, OS X, Ouya: WW: January 12, 2016; iOS: WW: October 5, 2016
- Genres: Adventure, art
- Mode: Single-player

That Dragon, Cancer is a 2016 Christian art video game created by Ryan and Amy Green, Josh Larson, and a small team under the name Numinous Games. The game is an autobiography based on the Greens' experience of raising their son Joel, who was diagnosed with terminal cancer at twelve months old. Though only given a short time to live, Joel survived for four more years before dying in March 2014.

The game is designed to have the player experience the low and high moments of this period in the style of a point-and-click adventure game, using the medium's interactivity and immersion to relate the tale in ways that a film cannot. It was initially developed to relate Ryan and Amy's personal experience with Joel when they were uncertain of his health, but following his death, they reworked much of the game to memorialize and personalize their time and interactions with Joel for the player.

That Dragon, Cancer was initially aimed for release as a time-limited exclusive for the Ouya, whose makers helped to fund the game's development. With expanded funding and a larger scope to the game, the developers engaged in a crowdfunding campaign on Kickstarter, in association with Ouya, to secure additional funds to complete the game, assuring simultaneous release on other platforms including Microsoft Windows and Mac OS X. The game was released on January 12, 2016, on what would have been Joel's seventh birthday. An iOS version was released in October 2016. The game was praised for being an example of video games as an art form and raw autobiographical experience from the parents' view, making the player deal with the difficult emotions and the strength of the Greens' faith. Alongside the game, a documentary, Thank You for Playing, documenting both the last few years of Joel's life and the development of the game, was aired in 2016.

== Background ==
That Dragon, Cancer bore out from experiences that Ryan and Amy Green had after their third child Joel was diagnosed with an atypical teratoid rhabdoid tumor at twelve months of age. By November 2010, the doctors had given the child about four months to live, but despite developing seven additional tumors, Joel continued to live for four years following his initial diagnosis. Joel's condition left him mentally underdeveloped, being unable to speak even by age 2, and he required additional parental care and supervision, alongside numerous visits to doctors and hospitals for palliative care and chemotherapy treatment. In early 2014, Joel's condition worsened, and the Greens temporarily moved from Colorado to San Francisco to take part in an experimental drug trial. The new drug failed to relieve the boy's new symptoms, so the Greens, following the advice of the hospice, decided to remove his feeding tube, and he died on March 13, 2014, at the age of five.

== Gameplay ==
That Dragon, Cancer is played as an exploration game from both third- and first-person perspective through a number of abstracted scenes based on the Greens' experience with raising Joel from learning of his condition through his death. The player takes the role of Joel's parents in fourteen small vignettes that capture some of the emotional moments they had to face during Joel's life expressed as interactive art. The player is able to interact with the characters and make certain choices, similar to those faced by the Greens. The first scene is where the parents have learned of their child's diagnosis, having the player consider their new responsibilities for caring for the child while reflecting on the "absurdity and sterility" of the hospital setting. The game includes fantasizing and imaginative reconstructions of some of the real moments the Greens experienced, such as a wagon ride in a hospital being envisioned as a colorful racing game. Alongside the interactivity, the game includes narration from Ryan, Amy, and other family members, as well as recordings such as voicemails that they had made during their time with Joel. The scenes include cards, letters, and other mementos of support for the Greens, sent by people who had experienced similar losses in their life.

== Development ==
Ryan Green came up with the idea for the game when Joel was four. He and Amy, both devout Christians, felt that the added years they had with Joel from the original diagnosis were a miracle. Prior to the idea, Green had written some smaller games that were meant to be more emotional, such as Giga Wife, which demonstrated how one's interactions with a spouse could be negatively compared to a Tamagotchi-like game. While at church, Ryan came up with the idea for That Dragon, Cancer during their reflection on the past few years, specifically recalling a night at the hospital where he was trying to stop Joel from crying but anything he did seemed to make his crying worse; only after he sat down and prayed to God did Joel stop crying; Ryan recalled how that reminded him of a video game with subverted game mechanics. He wanted to relay his experiences of raising Joel to a larger audience, and felt that an interactive video game would be a better medium to express a message of grace. Ryan stated that with video games "you can create this world and ask the player to live in it and love what you have created". The name of the game is taken from a story that the Greens had told their other sons about Joel's illness through an allegory about how Joel was a brave knight fighting a dragon named Cancer.

Ryan and Amy worked with Josh Larson, a game developer who Ryan met in 2010 while working at Soma Games, a developer for Christian video games. Their friendship developed further after a game jam in 2011. The two began talking about co-developing a game, and Larson had suggested that their hardships with Joel would make for a strong project. By late 2012, Larson agreed to forgo contract work for a year to work off savings to help bring the game to life, and after discussion with Amy, Ryan also agreed to spend three months to help develop the title before returning to work. Once those months were over, Amy could not force Ryan to go back to work, both feeling that the game needed to be completed at this point. Amy, a writer, had already written a self-published book about their experience with Joel, He's Not Dead Yet, and participated as the writer for the game, bringing in some of her existing narrative into the game. The Greens and Larson created the studio Numinous Games to distribute the title. Though the continuation of the studio will depend on the success of That Dragon, Cancer, they expect to be able to continue to make similar emotional games using other third-party stories for inspiration, with expectations that being less involved will help to make further projects run smoother.

Ryan began to seek funding to help support the project. He had initially developed a short demonstration of the game based on trying to calm Joel during that night at the hospital, which he and Larson demonstrated at the 2013 Game Developers Conference. The translated scene in the demonstration had the player, as Ryan, at home with Joel at their nursery, with Joel constantly crying. Though numerous objects such as toys and books are given for the player to try to calm Joel down, none of them work, and attempting to leave the nursery was forbidden; only until all of the provided options were tried was the player given the last choice to sit down and resort to prayer to calm Joel down. The demonstration caught the attention of many of the media there, putting the title into the limelight. Several investors stepped forward to offer to help fund the completion of the game, but some of these investors later backed out, considering the project to be too risky. Ryan Green secured a deal with funding from Ouya to develop the game, in exchange for a time-limited exclusivity for the micro-console. Much of this came from Kellee Santiago, who at the time had been recently named as Ouya's head of developer relations. After seeing the game at its current state in early 2013, Santiago "felt it needed to be made". The Ouya funding helped to support the Greens and Larson, as well as enabling them to hire three more developers. When Green announced the Ouya deal in August 2013, a few months after the console's public release to lukewarm reception, many criticized Green's choice due to the poor perception of the Ouya system, as well as a poorly worded Twitter message that Ouya had used to announce the product. Green defended his choice of opting for the Ouya, stating the company behind the device has good intentions towards the larger goal.

The additional funding, though significant, expanded the scope of the game and caused some setbacks, and for some periods, the Greens lived off loans and donations during the development. Following Joel's death in 2014, Ryan was further committed to completing the game to honor Joel's memory and as a way to cope with his loss, and picked up its development soon after Joel's funeral. To that point the game had been written based on unknowing of Joel's fate, but with his death, the team recognized that much of what they had in place was more focused on the narrative from Ryan and Amy's side, and made it feel more of a selfish work. There were also concerns from investors about the interactivity of the title. They rewrote about 70% of the game to make it more focused on the interactions with Joel. Originally, the game would have ended with the player witnessing a machine with numerous levers that could be pulled, giving the player some sense of control, but when they examined the machine's internals, would realize that all of the levers were disconnected, and that they had no control of the situation. Following Joel's death, they felt this scene was no longer applicable, and replaced it with the players interacting a final time with Joel in a cathedral in an afterlife-type setting as to bring closure to their story. With the change, Ryan hoped that the game would help people to cope and open up with others about the loss of loved ones. One design decision made was to represent the characters in the game with blank faces. Ryan stated that this was both that being a small team they did not have the technical capability to fully program and animate the character's faces, and that by leaving the faces featureless, it would help players engage by imagining themselves in the place of the game's characters.

In November 2014 with the Ouya and other investment funding running out, Ryan Green announced that to have the widest impact for their game, they had opted to forgo the Ouya exclusivity, and in association with Ouya, launched a Kickstarter campaign with the goal to have simultaneous release of the Ouya version alongside versions for Windows and Mac OS X. The campaign was designed to raise sufficient funds, $85,000, to avoid pushing back the title from the planned mid-2015 release, and would be aided, if its goal were met, by personal loans and funding from the Indie Fund. The Kickstarter was successful, raising more than $100,000 from nearly 3,700 backers, and through it, several funders shared with the Greens their own photos and stories of their losses of their children at young ages due to incurable or inoperable maladies, which would be included within the game.

The game was released on January 12, 2016, coinciding with what would have been Joel's seventh birthday. The Greens encouraged supporters to enjoy pancakes for dinner on the day of release, as it was Joel's favorite food. Razer Inc., which acquired the Ouya platform and properties in 2015, stated that all revenue from sales of That Dragon, Cancer on Ouya would be donated to the Morgan Adams Foundation and Family House SF, two charities that had assisted the Greens during Joel's treatment in San Francisco.

An iOS version was released on October 5, 2016.

== Documentary ==
A documentary about the Greens and their development of That Dragon, Cancer was announced in April 2014, entitled Thank You for Playing. It was produced by David Osit and Malika Zouhali-Worrall independent of the game's development. The documentary was picked up by PBS as part of POV, to air in 2016, while a preview airing was shown in August 2015 at the PAX Expo. Through a successful Kickstarter, the film had a limited theatrical run before its digital release in March 2016. The documentary was broadcast on television on PBS on October 24, 2016. An audio documentary on the genesis of the game and the family's grief in preparing for Joel's death was produced by Gimlet with interviews by Ryan and Amy Green.

That Dragon, Cancer and Ryan Green were featured in the 2015 documentary GameLoading: Rise of The Indies.

== Reception ==
That Dragon, Cancer was highly praised by reviewers on its release, with many favorably commenting on the overwhelming emotional difficulty presented that forces the player to experience and understand what the Greens had gone through with Joel. Sam Machkevoch of Ars Technica noted that while other games have tried to elicit similar emotions from its players, That Dragon, Cancer was unique in its approach for being "so frank, so nakedly autobiographical, and so imbued with its creators' spiritual identities". Cassandra Khaw for Ars Technica believed that while some of the vignettes were not as powerful as others, That Dragon, Cancer made effective use of the video game medium, as by forcing the player to interact instead of remaining an observer, the game "compels us to shoulder some of the creators’ grief and to embrace the legacy of Joel’s short life". Lucy O'Brien for IGN summarized her review of the game as "imperfect, but unforgettable".

In March 2016, Ryan Green, speaking for his team, commented that the game has only sold about 14,000 copies, based on Steam Spy data, and they have yet to recover their development funds for the game. Ryan noted that many Let's Play videos, gathering more than a million views, of That Dragon, Cancer had simply played through the game without commenting on it or providing viewers with links and information about the game, giving viewers no incentive to purchase the title once they had seen it in its entirety. Numinous Games used YouTube's ContentID system to flag and take down some of these videos, leading some players to complain. Ryan admitted this was not the best approach towards addressing the issue. Ryan felt that they would be satisfied if these viewers had left small tips on Numinous Games' website in lieu of purchasing the game, so that Numinous could continue to develop more titles.

=== Accolades ===
Year	Award	Category	Result	Ref.
2016	Emotional Games Awards 2016	Best Emotional Indie Game	Won	
2016	Independent Games Festival Awards 2016	Excellence in Audio and Narrative	Nominated	
2016	Games for Change Awards 2016	Best Gameplay	Won	
2016	Games for Change Awards 2016	Most Innovative	Won	
2016	The Game Awards 2016	Games for Impact	Won	
2017	20th Annual D.I.C.E. Awards	D.I.C.E. Sprite Award	Nominated	
2017	20th Annual D.I.C.E. Awards	Outstanding Achievement in Story	Nominated	
2017	National Academy of Video Game Trade Reviewers	Game, Special Class	Won	
2017	2017 SXSW Gaming Awards	Matthew Crump Cultural Innovation Award	Won	
2017	2017 SXSW Gaming Awards	Excellence in Narrative	Nominated	
2017	2017 SXSW Gaming Awards	Most Fulfilling Community-Funded Game	Nominated	
2017	13th British Academy Games Awards	Debut Game	Nominated	
2017	13th British Academy Games Awards	Game Innovation	Won	
