= Reporter (film) =

- Directed by: Eric Daniel Metzgar
- Produced by: Ben Affleck; Mikaela Beardsley; Steven Cantor
- Starring: Nicholas D. Kristof
- Cinematography: Eric Daniel Metzgar
- Edited by: Eric Daniel Metzgar
- Music by: Eric Liebman
- Release date: January 16, 2009 (Sundance)
- Language: English

Reporter is a 2009 documentary film about the work of New York Times columnist Nicholas D. Kristof in the Democratic Republic of Congo. Executive produced by Ben Affleck and directed by Eric Daniel Metzgar, the HBO movie captures life in the war-ravaged African country and specifically focuses on the challenges faced by international correspondents in covering the region's crises.

== Production ==
The documentary was filmed during the summer of 2007, when Kristof traveled to eastern Congo with Leana Wen, then an American medical student, and Will Okun, a high school teacher from Chicago. Wen and Okun were chosen to travel with Kristof as winners of the Second Annual Win A Trip with Nick Kristof contest, held in 2007 by The New York Times.

== Release ==
Reporter premiered at the 2009 Sundance Film Festival and aired on HBO on February 18, 2010.

== Reception ==
In reviewing the film, Entertainment Weekly wrote: "In Reporter, he's a compelling figure, a cross between Mother Teresa and the James Woods character in Salvador, and what seals the intensity of his job is the danger." The Washington Post observed, "Ideally, [Kristof] hopes to teach his companions, who won a contest to travel with him, about the value of witnessing the world's atrocities and scintillating them into stories that will call on people to act."

Reporter was nominated for the Grand Jury Prize at the 2009 Sundance Film Festival.
