= Choroid plexus tumor =

Cancer of the cells that produce cerebrospinal fluid in the ventricles of the brain

- Specialty: Neurology, oncology
- Usual onset: Most common in infants, but can occur at any age
- Prognosis: Five-year survival rate: 63.9%
- Frequency: ~124 diagnoses annually (United States)

Choroid plexus tumors are a rare type of cancer that occur from the brain tissue called choroid plexus of the brain. Choroid plexus tumors are uncommon tumors of the central nervous system that account for 0.5–0.6% of intracranial neoplasms in people of all ages. Choroid plexus papilloma, atypical choroid plexus papilloma, and choroid plexus carcinoma are the three World Health Organization types for these neoplasms. Children under the age of five account for 10% of cases of choroid plexus tumors. In children and adults, respectively, the lateral ventricle and the fourth ventricle are common locations, About 5% of all choroid plexus tumors are located in the third ventricle. Along with other unusual places such the cerebellopontine angle, the Luschka foramen, or brain parenchyma, the third ventricle is a rare location for choroid plexus tumors. Together, atypical choroid plexus papilloma, and choroid plexus carcinoma make up around 25% of all choroid plexus tumors. Although there have been reports of third ventricle choroid plexus papillomas in people in their fifth decade of life, only 14% of choroid plexus tumors are reported to arise in infants. Most findings indicate that choroid plexus tumors have no sex predilection.

== Clinical features ==
Symptoms vary depending on the size and location of the tumor and typically include headaches, nausea and vomiting, irritability, and decreased energy. Choroid plexus tumors in the third ventricle region typically manifest symptoms earlier in life than tumors found in other prevalent locations, according to the anatomical characteristics. Macrocephaly, splayed cranial sutures, fontanel widening/bulging, and forced downward look, often known as sunset eyes, are common presentations of hydrocephalus in the pediatric population, Headaches, nauseousness, vomiting, and vision abnormalities are common in older individuals. Rarely, these tumors can cause endocrine problems or the bobbing head doll syndrome.

== Imaging characteristics ==
Choroid plexus tumors appear as well-defined, large lobulated masses on CT and MR imaging. Due to the micro-hemorrhages and micro-calcifications, they show as hyperdense structures on CT scans. Tumor signal seems to be isointense on T1 and isointense to moderately hyperintense on T2 sequences on MR imaging, respectively. These tumors show up brightly and uniformly following the injection of contrast agent on both CT and MRI because the high vascularity of structures originating from the choroid plexus causes these enhancements. Calcifications in children are uncommon, however they can occur in 14–25 percent of instances in people of all ages. Although there are no defined imaging standards for choroid plexus carcinomas, parenchymal invasion or heterogeneous enhancement brought on by necrotic regions, calcifications, or micro-hemorrhages may provide a clue.

== Diagnosis ==
=== Classification ===
- Choroid plexus carcinoma (WHO grade 3)
- Atypical choroid plexus papilloma (WHO grade 2)
- Choroid plexus papilloma (WHO grade 1)

== Treatment ==
In all choroid plexus tumors, maximal surgical resection is the first line of therapy. Resection of tumors in this region is difficult and requires a high level of expertise. There have been a few reports of preoperative feeder artery embolization, however this method is difficult and carries a risk of vascular damage or stroke. An alternative strategy that decreases tumor size and vascularity and makes complete excision easier is neoadjuvant chemotherapy. Chemotherapy confers a definite survival benefit in choroid plexus carcinoma and maybe beneficial in selected cases of atypical choroid plexus papillomas. When a tumor cannot be surgically removed, the best course of treatment is a neuroendoscopic biopsy followed by chemotherapy and radiation.

== Outcome ==
The degree of resection and tumor grade are the primary prognostic variables in choroid plexus tumors. According to several sources, the greatest outcome is anticipated for completely resected choroid plexus papillomas, with a 10-year survival rate of almost 100%. Whereas, following total or partial resection, the 5-year survival rates for choroid plexus carcinoma patients are, respectively, 58 percent and 20 percent.

== See also ==
- Brain tumor
