= Choroid plexus carcinoma =

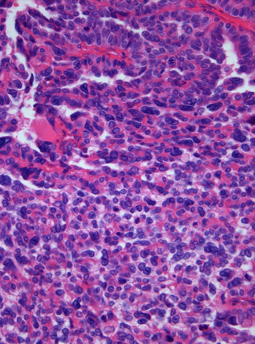
- Photomicrograph of hematoxylin-eosin stained section of a choroid plexus carcinoma (grade III WHO) at 400x magnification
- Specialty: Neuro-oncology

A choroid plexus carcinoma (WHO grade III) is a type of choroid plexus tumor that affects the choroid plexus of the brain. It is considered the worst of the three grades of chord plexus tumors, having a much poorer prognosis than choroid atypical plexus papilloma (WHO grade II) and choroid plexus papilloma (WHO grade I). The disease creates lesions in the brain and increases cerebrospinal fluid volume, resulting in hydrocephalus.

== Signs and symptoms ==
The symptoms of choroid plexus carcinoma are similar to those of other brain tumors. They include:

- Persistent or new onset headaches
- Macrocephaly or bulging fontanels in infants.
- Loss of appetite (refusal to take food in infants)
- Papilledema
- Nausea and emesis
- Ataxia
- Strabismus
- Developmental delays
- Altered mental status

== Cause ==
The cause of choroid plexus carcinomas are relatively unknown, although hereditary factors are suspected. They sometimes occur in conjunction with other hereditary cancers, including Li–Fraumeni syndrome and malignant rhabdoid tumors. A mutation in the tumor suppressor gene TP53 is usually characterized in this disease.

== Pathophysiology ==
Choroid plexus carcinomas typically occur in the lateral ventricles in children and in the fourth ventricle of adults. The third ventricle is the least common ventricle affected. This is unlike most other pediatric and adult tumors, as the locations of the tumors are typically reversed. These tumors are usually found in the infratentorial region in children and in the supratentorial space in adults. Choroid plexus carcinomas can induce hydrocephalus through a variety of mechanisms, including blockage of normal cerebrospinal fluid (CSF) flow, the tumor overproducing CSF, spontaneous hemorrhage, and expansion of the ventricles.

The tumors most frequently spread through the CSF. As a result, metastases frequently occur along the central nervous system, particularly in the leptomeninges. In rare cases, metastases have been reported to spread to the abdomen and extra-cranial sites.

== Treatment ==
Treatment of choroid plexus carcinoma depends on the location and severity of the tumor. Possible interventions include inserting shunts, surgical resection, radiotherapy, and chemotherapy. Inserting a shunt could help to drain the CSF and relieve pressure on the brain. The best outcomes occur when total resection of the tumor is combined with adjuvant chemotherapy and radiotherapy. In the event of subtotal resection or widespread leptomeningeal disease, craniospinal irradiation is often used.

== Incidence ==
Choroid plexus tumors have an annual incidence of about 0.3 per 1 million cases. It is seen mainly in children under the age of 5, representing 5% of all pediatric tumors and 20% of tumors in children less than 1 year old. There has been no link between sex and occurrence.

Although choroid plexus carcinomas are significantly more aggressive and have half the survival rate as choroid plexus papillomas, they are outnumbered in incidence by 5:1 in all age groups. Clinical studies have shown that patients who receive a total resection of a tumor have an 86% survival rate, while patients who only receive a partial resection have a 26% 5-year survival rate. Many incomplete resections result in recurrence within 2 years of primary surgery.

== See also ==
- Choroid plexus
- Brain tumor
