= Malika Zouhali-Worrall =

British-Moroccan documentary filmmaker

- Occupations: Director, Editor
- Known for: Call Me Kuchu, Thank You For Playing, Through the Night

Malika Zouhali-Worrall is a British-Moroccan film director and editor. She edited the feature documentaries Seeds (2025) and Union (film) (2024), both of which received awards at the Sundance Film Festival.

Zouhali-Worrall's first feature as a director was the 2012 documentary Call Me Kuchu, about Ugandan activist David Kato, which premiered at the Berlin International Film Festival, going on to win the Teddy Award and the Cinema fairbindet Award among others. Her second feature, directed collaboratively with David Osit, was the 2015 documentary Thank You for Playing. Osit and Zouhali-Worrall also directed the short film "Games You Can't Win" for The New York Times Op-Docs. Both the feature and short were inspired by the art house video game That Dragon, Cancer. In 2017, Thank You For Playing won an Emmy Award for Outstanding Arts and Culture Documentary.

Zouhali-Worrall is also the director of the documentary shorts "Strange Grace: The Art of Amyra Léon", which broadcast on PBS American Masters in 2020, and "Video Visit", a Field of Vision film, which premiered at BlackStar Film Festival and the American Film Institute Film Festival in 2021.

She is the editor of the 2020 documentary Through the Night, directed by Loira Limbal, which premiered at the Tribeca Film Festival, and was named one of The Guardian’s Best Documentaries of 2020.

Zouhali-Worrall is married to Wired journalist Andy Greenberg.
