= The Chances of the World Changing =

- DVD cover
- Directed by: Eric Daniel Metzgar
- Produced by: Eric Daniel Metzgar
- Music by: Eric Liebman
- Release date: April 8, 2006 (Full Frame Documentary Film Festival)
- Running time: 99 minutes
- Country: United States
- Language: English

The Chances of the World Changing is a 2006 documentary film about Richard Ogust's efforts to save endangered turtle species from extinction. It was directed and produced by Eric Daniel Metzgar (Merigold Moving Pictures) and produced by Nell Carden Grey (Pigeon Post Pictures). Other credits include Eric Liebman (original music), Noe Venable (additional music and voice-over engineer), and Faun Fables (contributor of the song "Live Old").

The film follows Ogust's efforts to establish a "Noah's Ark," or sanctuary and research institute, in order to preserve the animals until such time that they can be returned to their natural habitats, which are being wiped out by ecological destruction and poaching — the problem that conservation biologists have dubbed "the Asian turtle crisis".

Chances premiered at the 2006 Full Frame Documentary Film Festival and was aired on the Public Broadcasting Service series P.O.V. beginning July 17, 2007. It was also nominated for the Axium Truer Than Fiction Award as part of the 2007 Independent Spirit Awards.
