= Life. Support. Music. =

- Directed by: Eric Daniel Metzgar
- Produced by: Eric Daniel Metzgar
- Cinematography: Eric Daniel Metzgar
- Edited by: Eric Daniel Metzgar
- Music by: Eric Liebman
- Distributed by: Merigold Moving Pictures
- Release date: May 4, 2008 (Full Frame Documentary Film Festival)
- Country: United States
- Language: English

Life. Support. Music. is a 2008 documentary film and is Eric Daniel Metzgar's second documentary. It premiered at the 2008 Full Frame Documentary Film Festival in Durham, North Carolina.

== Background ==
As Metzgar explains on the film’s website, Life. Support. Music. tells the story of Jason Crigler, a successful New York-based guitarist who, while playing a show in New York City in 2004, suffered a devastating brain injury. At the hospital after his injury, doctors told Jason’s family, "if he makes it through the night, there won’t be much left of him". Jason’s wife, Monica, pregnant at the time, recounts that she froze. "Everything completely stopped. I forgot all about [my] pregnancy. I think I left my body. I remember thinking, this cannot be true. I cannot go on without Jason".

Days passed, and Jason’s family was forced to accept the new dark reality at hand. But they refused to accept the dark future described by doubtful doctors. So in the face of wrenching despair and horrifying odds, the Criglers made a resolution, "Jason will make a full recovery".

The film features interviews with Norah Jones (who hosted a benefit concert to help defray Jason’s medical expenses), Marshall Crenshaw, Teddy Thompson and others. The film’s original music was created by Eric Liebman.

== Screening ==
Life. Support. Music. premiered at the 2008 Full Frame Documentary Film Festival in Durham, North Carolina. It then screened at multiple national and international festivals, including the Ashland Film Festival in Ashland, Oregon, the HotDocs Canadian International Film Festival in Toronto, Ontario, the Independent Film Festival of Boston in Boston, Massachusetts, the Jackson Hole Film Festival in Jackson, Wyoming, the Newport International Film Festival in Newport, Rhode Island, the Maine International Film Festival in Waterville, Maine, the Bioneers Moving Image Festival in San Rafael, California, Silverdocs: AFI/Discovery Channel Documentary Festival in Washington, DC, the Festival Internazionale del Film di Roma in Rome, Italy, Camden International Film Festival in Camden, Maine, and Dokufest International Documentary Festival in Prizren, Republic of Kosova.

== Awards ==
- Audience Choice Award, Independent Film Festival of Boston
- ENEL Cuore Award for Best Social Documentary, Rome International Film Festival
- Audience Choice Award, Aspen Film Festival (Carbondale, Colorado)
- Best Documentary (Honorable Mention), Newport International Film Festival

== Release ==
Life. Support. Music. began a theatrical run in New York City on February 6, 2009; director Eric Daniel Metzgar and subject Jason Crigler participated in Q&A sessions during the first several screenings.

The film will be broadcast in the United States on the Public Broadcasting Service's P.O.V. series beginning July 7, 2009.

== Additional sources ==
- Cinema Verdict, Review of Life. Support. Music.
- Filmbaby, Review of Life. Support. Music.
