= Janet Mikhail =

Palestinian politician (born 1945)

Janet Mikhail جانيت ميخائيل
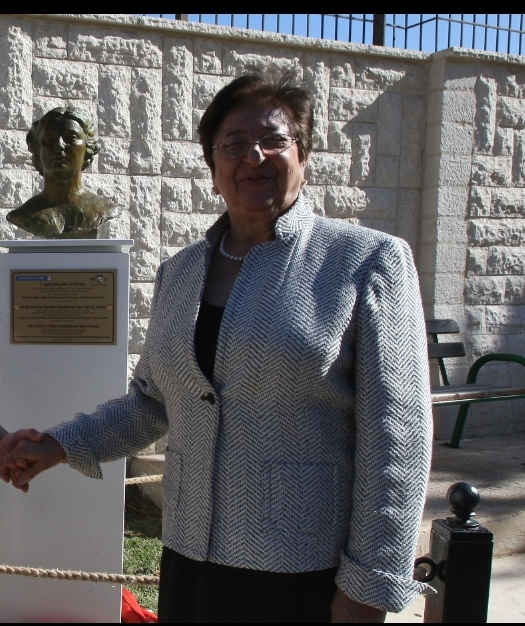

Mayor of Ramallah
- In office 2006–2012
- Succeeded by: Mousa Hadid

Personal details
- Born: 13 November 1942 (age 83) Ramallah, West Bank
- Education: George Fox University (BS)

Janet Mikhail (Arabic: جانيت ميخائيل; born 13 November 1942) or Janet Michael, sometimes known as Janet Khouri (جانيت خوري) is a Palestinian politician who served as Mayor of Ramallah from 2006 to 2012. Prior to her mayoralty she worked as an educator and with the Ministry of Education and Higher Education.

== Early life and education ==
Janet Nicola Mikhail was born in Ramallah on 13 November 1942. She was educated at the Ramallah Girls' Primary School and Ramallah Girls' Secondary School. She graduated from high school in 1959, received a diploma in science from the Teachers' Training College in 1961, and Bachelor of Science degree in chemistry from George Fox University in 1973. She is a Palestinian Christian.

== Career ==
At the Ramallah Girls' Secondary School, Mikhail was a teacher in 1961, and principal from 1985 to 2003. Mikhail was a member of the Tamer Institute for Community Education's administrative board from 1997 to 2021. She was a member of the Education Development Committee within the Ministry of Education and Higher Education in 2000, and an education consultant for the ministry from 2003 to 2005.

The first municipal elections were held in Ramallah in 2005. Mikhail led the Ramallah for All electoral list in the election and it won 6 seats on the 15-member municipal council of Ramallah. A quota created by Yasser Arafat guaranteed 8 of the seats to Christians. The council, including members of Hamas and the Popular Front for the Liberation of Palestine, voted to make her mayor. She was the first woman to serve as mayor in Palestine.

During Mikhail's tenure as mayor she was denied a visa by the German embassy when she attempted to attend a conference in Germany. A purification station was constructed in At-Tira during her tenure. She criticised the United States Agency for International Development for not providing foreign aid to Ramallah.

== Works cited ==
=== News ===
- مسيحية ترأس بلدية رام الله وتتحالف مع حماس [A Christian woman heads the Ramallah municipality and allies with Hamas.]. Monte Carlo Doualiya (in Arabic). 1 January 2006. Archived from the original on 2 November 2026.
- Abukhater, Maher (25 December 2010). "Palestinian mayor presides over boom times in Ramallah". Los Angeles Times. Archived from the original on 2 November 2026.
- Collard, Rebecca (25 February 2012). "Janet Mikhail is more than just the mayor of Ramallah". The National. Archived from the original on 2 November 2026.

=== Web ===
- جانيت ميخائيل [Janet Mikhail] (in Arabic). Vision for Political Development. 12 April 2020. Archived from the original on 2 November 2026.
- مجموعة جانيت ميخائيل [Janet Mikhail Collection] (in Arabic). The Palestinian Museum. 12 April 2020. Archived from the original on 2 November 2026.
