= Nadeem al-Zaro =

Jordanian politician

Transport Minister
- In office 1971–1973
- Prime Minister: Ahmad al-Lawzi, Zaid al-Rifai

Interior Minister
- In office 1970
- Prime Minister: Bahjat Talhouni

Personal details
- Born: 29 June 1931 Ramallah, Mandatory Palestine
- Died: 28 February 2014 (aged 82)

Nadeem al-Zaro (29 June 1931 – 28 February 2014) was a Jordanian politician. He held several ministerial posts during the 1970s. Zaro was Interior Minister during the fourth term of Prime Minister Bahjat Talhouni in 1970. He was Transport Minister during the term of Prime Minister Ahmad al-Lawzi (1971–1973). He continued in this position during the subsequent government of Zaid al-Rifai.
