= Thank You for Playing =

- Film poster
- Directed by: David Osit & Malika Zouhali-Worrall
- Produced by: David Osit & Malika Zouhali-Worrall
- Cinematography: David Osit
- Edited by: David Osit & Malika Zouhali-Worrall
- Distributed by: FilmBuff
- Release date: April 17, 2015 (Tribeca Film Festival)
- Running time: 81 minutes
- Country: United States
- Language: English

Thank You for Playing is an American documentary film, produced and directed by Malika Zouhali-Worrall and David Osit. The film follows the development of the video game That Dragon, Cancer, which tells the story of Ryan and Amy Green raising their son Joel who has been diagnosed with cancer.

== Release ==
Thank You for Playing premiered on April 17, 2015 at the Tribeca Film Festival. The film was nationally broadcast on POV during the 2016–2017 season on PBS.

== Reception ==
The film has been praised by video game publication Unwinnable, which called it "the most important videogame movie ever made."

In his review for The Hollywood Reporter Justin Lowe said "By turns touching, funny and sometimes strangely existential, David Osit and Malika Zouhali-Worrall’s documentary, destined for broadcast on public television’s POV program next year, succeeds in telling a highly personal story in a surprisingly relatable manner."

== Awards ==
2015 - Twin Cities Film Festival - Best Documentary
2016 - Cinema Eye Honors nomination for Outstanding Achievement in Graphic Design or Animation
2017 - News & Documentary Emmy Award for Outstanding Arts & Culture Documentary
2017 - News & Documentary Emmy Award nomination for Outstanding Documentary
2017 - News & Documentary Emmy Award nomination for Outstanding Editing, Documentary
