= Recurrent cancer =

Reoccurrence of cancer

Recurrent cancer is any form of cancer that has returned or recurred when a fraction of primary tumor cells evade the effects of treatment and survive in small spaces that are undetectable by diagnostic tests. If recurrent cancer has already moved to other body parts or has developed chemo-resistance then it may be more aggressive than original cancer. In general, the severity of cancer increases with a shorter duration of time between initial treatment and its return.

Cancers with the highest recurrence rates include Glioblastoma with a recurrence rate of almost 100%, Epithelial ovarian cancer with a recurrence rate of 85%, and Bladder cancer with a recurrence rate of 30–54%

== Development ==
The initial tumor may become the site of cancer's return or it may spread to another part of the body. These surviving cells accumulate various genetic changes over time, eventually producing a new tumor cell. It can take up to weeks, months, or even years for cancer to return. Following surgery and/or chemotherapy or radiotherapy, certain tumor cells may persist and develop resistance to treatment and eventually develop into new tumors. The rate of cancer recurrence is determined by many factors, including age, sex, cancer type, treatment duration, stage of advancement, grade of original tumor, and cancer-specific risk factors.

== Types ==
There are three types of recurrent cancers:

- Local recurrence – Cancer returns to the same original site.
- Regional recurrence – Cancer is detected in tissue or lymph nodes near the original site.
- Distant recurrence – Cancer has been detected in tissue far from the original site. Also known as metastatic recurrence.

== Causes ==
=== Cancer stem cells ===
Cancer stem cells (CSC) are a small population of the entire tumor cell mass, that are responsible for early formation, progression, and recurrence of cancer. It also contributes to drug resistance. CSCs are thought to originate from normal stem cells, progenitor cells or differentiated cells as a result of cumulative genetic mutation and subsequent genomic instability. They are found in the tumor microenvironment's specialized niches. CSCs have so far been found in a variety of tumors, including those of the brain, breast, ovary, head and neck, etc.

CSCs have the ability of self-proliferation just like regular stem cells. A single CSC can divide asymmetrically into one CSC and one differentiated tumor cell. The tumor is majority made up of the latter cells.

In some cancers CSCs are quiescent for long period of time, making them ineffective to the treatment. Therefore, even decades after the primary cancer has been fully treated, the reactivation of the inactive CSCs may lead to tumor recurrence.

=== Neosis ===
Hypoxia, chemotherapeutic agents, and radiation can generate Polyploid Giant Cancer Cells (PGCC). Some PGCCs have the ability to undergo neosis, which is characterized by nuclear budding karyokinesis, asymmetric intracellular cytokinesis and the generation of Raju cells, which are tiny mononuclear cells having stem cell like characteristics. These cells play a role in cancer recurrence and therapy resistance.

=== Phoenix rising ===
Phoenix rising is a process by which dead cells send signals that promote growth and division, generating new cells. After a tissue injury, stem cells present in and around the injured tissue play a crucial role in replenishing the damaged ones. It is theorized that molecules released from wounded cells trigger stem cells' migration to that site, followed by differentiation and proliferation. Through the process of apoptosis, the dying tumor cells provide growth signals and repair radiation-damaged tumors. PGE2 is released by apoptotic cells in a caspase-dependent manner, which aids cancer stem cells and cancer progenitor cells in expanding and multiplying.

=== Cell stress and dormancy ===
Cancer recurrence (relapse) is ascribed to malignant cells that evade therapy: small numbers of cancer cells may remain undetected, and dormant, pausing their proliferation for long time. This can occur also by mechanisms different from cell cycle quiescence. In fact, the effects of therapy that kills most cancer cells, may cause a few of them to pause proliferation instead of dying. While the precise mechanism of growth arrest is not entirely clear and may not be uniform across cancer cases, malignant cells that survive chemotherapy make several metabolic adaptations and possess altered configuration of key positions of their chromatin, the material that packages their DNA. This has as result that certain conditions can trigger expression of genes that reignite cancer cell growth, causing proliferation, and additionally these conditions may trigger aberrant expression of genes that cause changes in the host tissue, which also permit cancer growth.

== Diagnosis ==
Early diagnosis of recurrence is important and can improve the prognosis and survival of patients with cancer. Depending on the primary cancer type, several laboratory and imaging tests, as well as numerous invasive procedures, are used for the diagnosis of recurring cancers. Malignant tumors develop and secrete biologic chemicals known as tumor markers that are detectable in the bloodstream. These markers might ideally be used to screen for cancer, diagnose it, and track how effectively it responds to treatment.

== Treatment ==
The inherent limits of current cancer therapy approaches usually result in treatment failure. Chemotherapy and radiation therapy resistance is a common factor in the failure of treatment for many cancers. Additionally, because most treatments cannot completely eradicate CSCs, many methods that are not adequately selective against CSCs might be harmful to healthy tissues, and patients frequently run the risk of recurrence and metastasis.

Recent years have seen the development of numerous treatments with the goal of eliminating CSC. Targeting CSC surface markers, the ABC cascade, the microenvironment, or signal cascades could all help kill CSCs. There are numerous drugs targeting these markers or pathways, which are being tested in clinical trials. The treatment varies from cancer to cancer and patient to patient.
