= Mousa Hadid =

Palestinian civil engineer; mayor of Ramallah

Musa Hadid موسى حديد
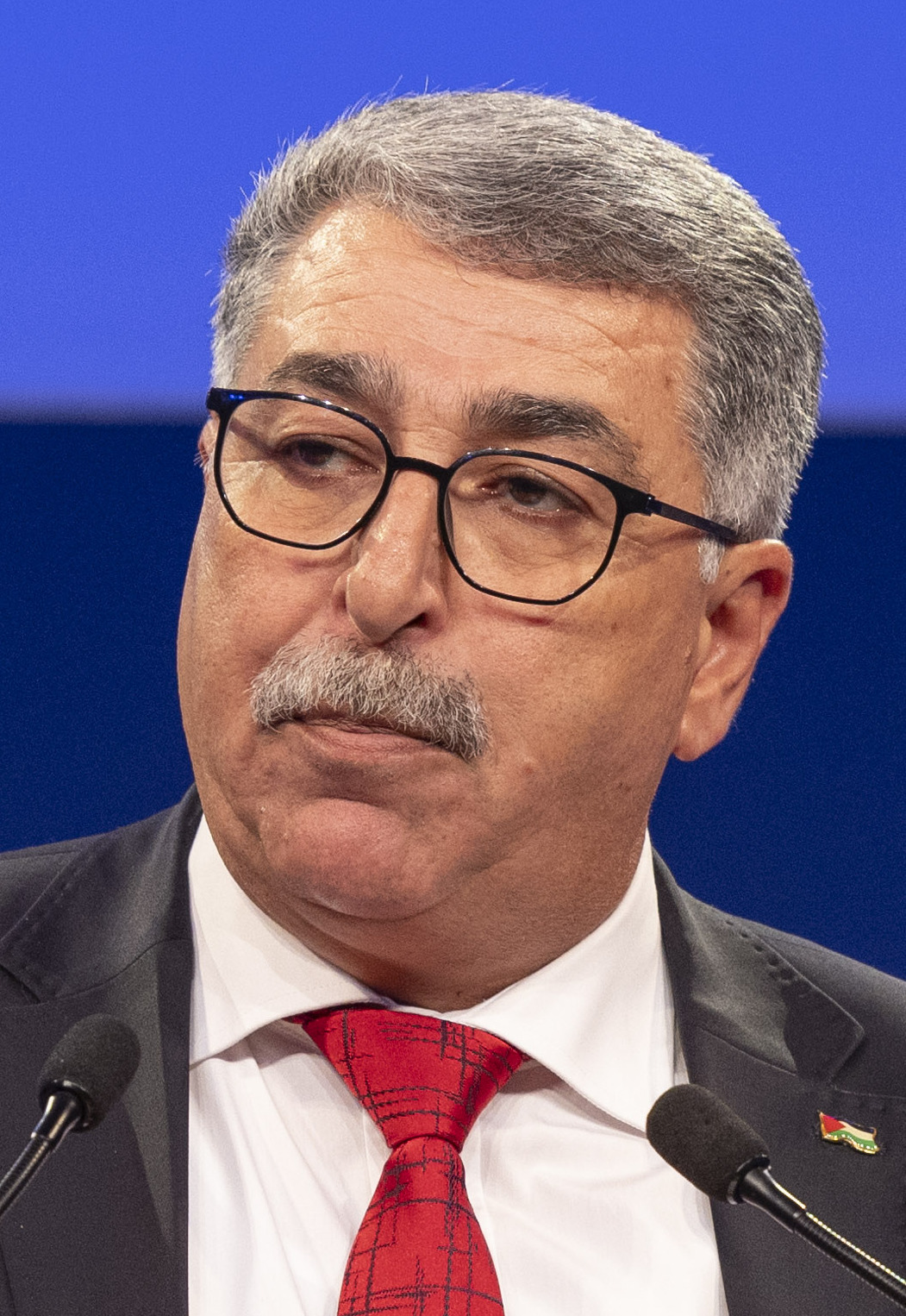
- Musa Hadid in 2023

Mayor of Ramallah
- In office 2012 – April 6, 2022
- Preceded by: Janet Mikhail
- Succeeded by: Issa Kassis

Personal details
- Born: March 13, 1965 (age 61) Ramallah, West Bank
- Party: Fatah
- Education: Birzeit University
- Occupation: Civil engineer

Musa Hadid (Arabic: موسى حديد; born 1965) is a Palestinian political figure and the former mayor of Ramallah, Palestine.

== Education and early life ==
Hadid studied at Birzeit University, graduating in 1993. He worked as a civil engineer for 20 years before turning to politics. He is a Christian.

== Political career ==
Hadid served as the mayor of Ramallah from 2012 to 2022. He is currently the Deputy Speaker of the Palestinian National Council.

== Film ==
In 2020, Hadid was the subject of an award-winning film called Mayor, directed by filmmaker David Osit. The film follows Musa Hadid's day-to-day life as mayor. The film has been called a "darkly comic saga" and "the best new film about the Israeli-Palestine conflict".

== Other activities ==
=== Non-profit organizations ===
- Head of the Palestinian Union of Local Authorities
- Member of the Higher Presidential Committee of Church Affairs in Palestine
- Member of the Municipal Development and Lending Fund
- Vice-chairman of the Board of Trustees of Al-Istiqlal Park
- Member of the Board of Trustees of the Mahmoud Darwish Museum
- Member of the Special Committee for the Consideration of Structuring Palestine into Development Regions
- Member of a Presidential Committee for Civil Peace.
