= Mayor of Ramallah =

Head of the executive branch of the government of Ramallah

- رئيس بلدية رام الله
- Incumbent; Issa Qassis since 2022
- Term length: 4 years, renewable once consecutively
- Formation: 1908
- First holder: Elias al-Dabini

The Mayor of Ramallah (Arabic: رئيس بلدية رام الله) is the head of government of the Palestinian city of Ramallah.

== History ==
In 1972, Karim Khalaf was elected Mayor of Ramallah, having previously served as the city's District Attorney. Khalaf adopted largely moderate stances concerning Israel; he supported a policy of non-cooperation with the military occupation of the West Bank, but was among the first Palestinian public officials to advocate for a two-state solution. In his early years as mayor, Khalaf was reluctant to deal with Yasser Arafat and the Palestine Liberation Organization. However, when he faced re-election in 1976, a split had begun to form between "pro-PLO" and "anti-PLO" politicians in the Palestinian municipalities. At this time, Khalaf began coordinating contacts with the PLO and promoting the group. This change in attitude allowed Khalaf to win a second term; in a year when many officials in the West Bank were voted out of office for not adequately backing Arafat and his aims. He won a third term in 1980. Khalaf was one of the most significant Palestinian mayors along with Hilmi Hanoun, mayor of Tulkarm, and Fahd Qawasmeh, mayor of Hebron.

In December 2005, local elections were held in Ramallah in which candidates from three different factions competed for a four-year term on the fifteen-seat municipal council. The council elected Janet Mikhail as mayor, the first woman to hold the post.

Mousa Hadid served as the mayor of Ramallah from 2012 to 2022. On 6 April 2022, Issa Qassis was appointed to be the new mayor of Ramallah.

== List ==
Mayor of Ramallah (1908–present)

Political party: Independent Fatah

| No. | Portrait | Name (birth–death) | Term of office | | | Political party | Election |
| No. | Portrait | Name (birth–death) | Took office | Left office | Time in office | Political party | Election |
|---|---|---|---|---|---|---|---|
Ottoman Palestine and OETA (1906–1920)
| 1 | | Elias al-Dabini | 1908 | 1921 | 13 years | Independent | |
Mandatory Palestine (1920–1948)
| 2 | | Youssef Darbas | 1921 | 1922 | 1 year | Independent | |
| 3 | | Rotational Government | 1922 | 1927 | 5 years | Independent | |
| 4 | | Musa Khalil Musa | 1927 | 1932 | 5 years | Independent | |
| 5 | | Saadallah al-Qassis | 1932 | 1946 | 4 years | Independent | |
| 6 | | Municipal Committee (Acting) | 1937 | 1940 | 3 years | Independent | |
| 7 | | Salem al-Zaarour | 1940 | 1943 | 3 years | Independent | |
| 8 | | Youssef Qaddoura | 1943 | 1947 | 4 years | Independent | |
| 9 | | Khalil Salah | 1947 | 1951 | 4 years | Independent | |
Jordanian rule (1950–1967)
| 10 | | Jalil Badran | 1951 | 1956 | 5 years | Independent | |
| 11 | | Municipal Committee (Acting) | 1956 | 1957 | 1 year | Independent | |
| 12 | | Jalil Harb (Committee) | 1957 | 1958 | 1 year | Independent | |
| 13 | | Municipal Committee (Acting) | 1958 | 1959 | 1 year | Independent | |
| 14 | | Jalil Harb (Committee) | 1959 | 1960 | 1 year | Independent | |
| 15 | | Jalil Harb | 1960 | 1962 | 2 years | Independent | |
| 16 | | Paul Saba | 1962 | 1964 | 2 years | Independent | |
| 17 | | Nadeem al-Zaro (1931–2014) | 1964 | 1967 | 3 years | Independent | |
Israeli military and civil administration (1967–1994)
| 17 | | Nadeem al-Zaro (1931–2014) | 1967 | 1969 | 2 years | Independent | |
| 18 | | Khalil Musa Khalil | 1969 | 1972 | 3 years | Independent | |
| 19 | | Karim Khalaf (1937–1985) | 1972 | 1982 | 10 years | Independent | |
| 20 | | Khalil Musa Khalil | 1988 | 1996 | 6 years | Independent | |
Palestinian Authority (1996–present)
| 21 | | Issa Ziada | 1996 | 1999 | 3 years | Independent | |
| 22 | | Ayoub Rabah | 1999 | 2005 | 6 years | Independent | |
| 23 | | Janet Mikhail (1945–) | 2005 | 2012 | 7 years | Independent | 2004–05 |
| 24 | | Mousa Hadid (1965–) | 2012 | 2022 | 10 years | Fatah | 2012–13; 2017 |
| 25 | | Issa Qassis | 2022 | 2026 | 4 years | Independent | |

== See also ==
- History of the West Bank
- History of Ramallah
