= Censorship of Roblox =

Countries where access to Roblox is currently blocked; Countries where access to Roblox is formerly blocked; Countries where Roblox is currently accessible

The online game platform Roblox has been censored in several countries by governments and other authorities. Various reasons are given, such as the safety of Roblox, the content within games, etc.

== Countries where access to Roblox is currently blocked ==
=== China ===
Documents reported by Vice's Motherboard following a leak revealed Roblox's strategy for entering the market in China. These include a 2017 presentation titled "China MVP Ideas from Aug Trip" and a 2018 document called "China Government Policy", outlining steps for collaboration with Tencent and compliance with local regulations. The documents specify that Roblox and its games must respect China's territorial integrity, referring to disputes involving Taiwan, Tibet, the South China Sea, and Aksai Chin. The platform would also need to verify user identities using national IDs and restrict international players on Chinese servers, applying the same data collection standards to all users. Other requirements include prohibitions on altering historical facts, promoting division or ethnic discrimination, inciting national hatred, depicting graphic violence, showing national leaders, or endorsing polygamy or casual sex.

In 2021, Roblox Corporation collaborated with Tencent to launch a Chinese version of its platform called LuoBuLeSi (Chinese: 罗布乐思). On 8 December 2021, the service was shut down due to local censorship, cross-border data regulations, and performance challenges. The company continues to operate in China and supports developers through LuoBu Studio, which allows content publication for both Roblox and the future LuoBu app. Roblox stated that changes related to LuoBuLeSi do not affect users outside China.

=== Egypt ===
On 1 February 2026, the Supreme Council for Media Regulation in Egypt passed a statement banning access to Roblox, with concerns being "internet and social media use among children".

On 4 February 2026, The National Telecommunications Regulatory Authority blocked access to the platform completely in its cooperation with the Supreme Council. The Supreme Council for Media Regulation and the National Telecommunications Regulatory Authority have yet to make a statement on what Roblox needs to change for reinstatement in Egypt, thus making the censorship indefinite for the foreseeable future.

=== Iraq ===
On 21 October 2025, Iraq blocked access to Roblox, citing concerns over child safety. Authorities stated that the game allowed direct communication between users, which could expose children and adolescents to exploitation or cyber extortion, and that the platform was "incompatible with social values and traditions". The Iraqi Communications Ministry announced that the ban followed a study and observations that found Roblox posed multiple "security, social, and behavioral risks".

Roblox Corporation said it prioritized user safety and would work with the government to restore access. A spokesperson said the claims were based on an outdated understanding of the platform and noted that certain communication features, such as in-game chat, had been temporarily suspended for Arabic-speaking countries earlier in 2025. The Kurdistan Regional Government implemented a similar block days later, citing the general interest of its population. A ministerial order added Roblox to the list of previously banned programs, sites, and applications in the region.

=== North Korea ===
Roblox is indefinitely blocked in North Korea due to the country's censorship, which blocks all foreign websites. Only North Korean websites are accessible.

=== Oman ===
In June 2025, the Telecommunications Regulatory Authority of Oman told the local newspaper Atheer that access to Roblox was blocked after authorities received multiple reports of inappropriate content being distributed to minors.

=== Palestine ===
On 17 November 2025, Palestine blocked access to Roblox following a decision by the Ministry of Communications and Digital Economy and the Telecommunications Regulatory Authority. The ministry stated that the decision was based on reviews of platform content and user interactions that were deemed inappropriate for children, including exposure to harassment and other unsafe digital behaviors. Authorities announced that they would work with Internet service providers to implement the ban and noted that similar measures had been taken in other Arab states.

=== Qatar ===
On 13 August 2025, Qatar blocked access to Roblox due to concerns over child safety following online protests for government action. Although the application remains available for download on app stores, users in Qatar cannot progress beyond the home screen, and the web version similarly returns an error.

=== Turkey ===
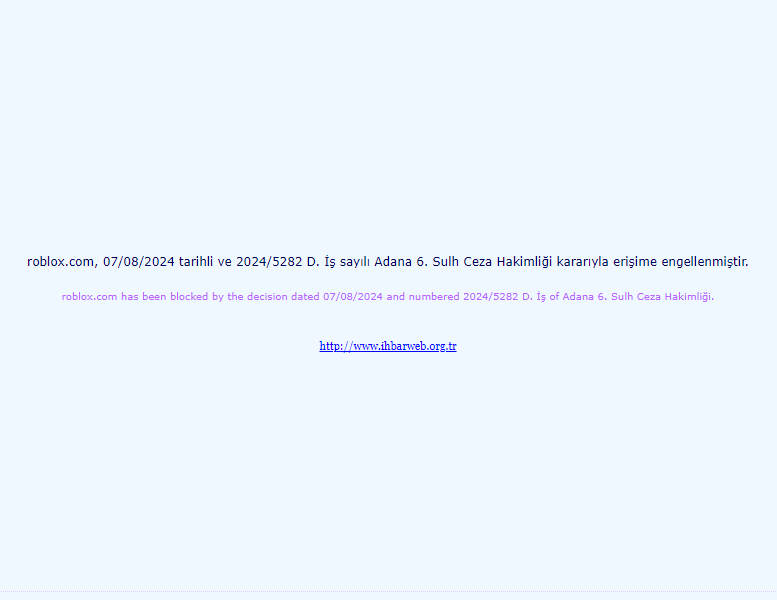
Ban message on the Roblox website in Turkey

On 7 August 2024, Turkey blocked access to Roblox over concerns that the platform contained content that could potentially lead to child abuse. Before its ban, Roblox had been downloaded 41 million times in Turkey since 2015. Justice Minister Yılmaz Tunç stated that, constitutionally, the state is obligated to take measures to protect children. The Adana 6th Criminal Court of Peace issued the block following an investigation by the Adana chief public prosecutor, citing the Turkish internet governance law enacted in 2007 and updated in 2020.

Roblox stated that it has been cooperating with Turkish authorities, policymakers, and other organizations on safety issues and has introduced several systems to protect users, particularly children. Turkish Transport and Infrastructure Minister Abdulkadir Uraloğlu stated that Roblox could be unbanned in the country if the platform complies with government requirements to remove specific content.

On 18 June 2026, several news platforms and Family and Social Services Minister Mahinur Özdemir Göktaş falsely claimed that Roblox was unblocked. However, the reports were quickly questioned as the ban remained, and the Minister quickly deleted her tweet.

== Countries where access to Roblox is blocked for certain ages ==
=== Brazil ===
On 17 March 2026, since social media was banned for children under 16 without parental consent and lootboxes ban for children under 18 began, Roblox was rated 18, but then eventually rated to 16, which restricted in-app purchases or even entire games for non-verified users in Brazil.

=== Indonesia ===
On March 28, 2026, Indonesia permanently blocked access to Roblox for individuals aged under 16 due to the platform being confirmed of including: harmful content; cyberbullying; fraud; predatory algorithms and addiction. Before the block occurred, Indonesia was reported of being the second–largest player base of the platform, with over 75% of Indonesian players being aged under 16 during the time. As a response, Roblox confirmed they will attempt to add an offline mode for individuals aged under 13, whilst individuals aged between 13–15, will receive stricter content and communication. However, on May 19, 2026, Roblox responded towards the block differently, than how they originally confirmed, they responded towards the block, by releasing Roblox Kids (ages 5–8), and Roblox Select (ages 9–15), earlier for Indonesia, before releasing Roblox Kids and Roblox Select globally.

== Countries where access to Roblox is boycotted ==
=== Vietnam ===
On July 1st, 2026, Roblox VNG started to publish the Vietnamese law to the gaming platform. Roblox users under the age of 12 cannot access Roblox, including Roblox Kids. Roblox users who are over the age of 12 can access Roblox. Other popular games like Blox Fruits, Rivals, 99 Nights In The Forest, Blue Lock Rivals, Murder Mystery 2 and The Strongest Battlegrounds got wiped out and cannot be accessed due to government-mandated removal. Limited to 3 hours/day, causing the entire global Roblox website, to not be accessible for buying gamepasses, and joining private servers. VPN connection got blocked/patched, chat feature in the platform got disabled and cannot let the players be brought back to the Global version.

== Countries where access to Roblox was formerly blocked ==
=== Algeria ===
On 8 September 2025, authorities in Algeria banned Roblox, stating that the company lacked sufficient tools and capacity to protect children. Officials reported that a growing number of Algerian users, particularly those under the age of ten, were being exposed to sexual harassment, other inappropriate content, and increasing incidents of fraud, scams, and child exploitation.

In 2026, Roblox had been unblocked in Algeria following a preliminary partnership agreement to restore access with strict safety measures in place. Although in-game chat remains were disabled for all users in Algeria until adequate Arabic-language moderation systems and technical safeguards are built.

Roblox has expanded parental controls covering screen time, spending limits, age-appropriate content, and faster reporting channels for harmful material.

The partnership includes a program through the Ministry of Post and Telecommunications to train local Algerian game developers to design games and reach international audiences.

=== Jordan ===
In 2020, Jordan blocked access to Roblox over concerns about children's mental health and well-being. In December 2025, Roblox Corporation reached an agreement with the Jordanian government to unblock Roblox, in which chat features on the platform would be disabled and "offensive content" would remain hidden.

=== Kuwait ===
In August 2025, Kuwait blocked access to Roblox over concerns about child safety, according to the Communications and Information Technology Regulatory Authority. The regulator stated that the decision was made under its legal authority to protect users, following complaints from parents and other agencies regarding children's exposure to harmful content on the platform.

The block followed a request from the Ministry of Information to the Ministry of Communications, citing potential risks to children, as well as increasing public concern from critics who claimed that the platform promoted immoral behavior, contained violent content, and encouraged inappropriate behavior.

According to Al Qabas, the ban was lifted after Roblox's developers agreed to introduce additional safety measures, including removing restricted terms, disabling in-game chat, and implementing monitoring systems to reduce harmful or inappropriate content. Officials stated that enforcement would continue and that further action would be taken if the platform violated these conditions.

=== Russia ===
On 3 December 2025, Russia blocked access to Roblox, stating that the platform distributed extremist materials and content classified as "LGBT propaganda". The communications regulator Roskomnadzor reported that the platform contained instances of child sexual harassment and the distribution of explicit images that could negatively affect the moral development of children.

In response to the ban, Roblox stated that it complies with local laws in the countries where it operates and highlighted its existing safety measures, including systems designed to detect and prevent harmful content. The company also announced plans to temporarily limit communication and revise content moderation, and stated that it would continue discussions with Roskomnadzor regarding the restoration of access.

On 9 June 2026, Minkomsvyaz and Roskomnadzor appealed to law enforcement agencies with a request to support the unblocking of Roblox in Russia. Roblox provided guarantees of compliance with Russian legislation, including the launch of age-restricted access to games. In early June, coordination with Roblox regarding the necessary conditions to protect the rights and interests of Russian users on the online gaming platform was successfully concluded. On 10 June 2026, Minkomsvyaz officially confirmed that Roblox had been unblocked in Russia. It is still unblocked as of October 2026.

=== United Arab Emirates ===
In 2018, Roblox was banned in the United Arab Emirates after Emirati Attorney General Dr. Hamad Saif Al Shamsi issued an order restricting access to several online gaming platforms, including Roblox, My Friend Cayla, Blue Whale, CloudPets, and Mariam.

As of 2021, the Telecommunications and Regulatory Authority confirmed that Roblox was no longer banned in the United Arab Emirates. Gulf News reported that the platform was available for download on devices via the App Store and Google Play.

== Countries where access to Roblox is proposed to be blocked ==
=== Bahrain ===
In August 2025, members of Bahrain's parliament began drafting a bill to ban Roblox in the country following concerns about child safety.

=== Philippines ===
The Cybercrime Investigation and Coordinating Center, an attached agency of the Department of Information and Communications Technology (DICT) on 20 March 2026 have placed Roblox under "strict monitoring" giving it one month (later reduced to 15 days) to deal with "illegal activities" such as harboring threat actors, including pedophiles and drug traffickers threatening to block the game in the Philippines. This followed an incident of law enforcement in the Philippines foiling an alleged school shooting plot of seven teenagers in Laguna after being influenced by "foreign handlers" via Roblox.

On 7 April 2026, the DICT announced that they and the Cybercrime Investigation and Coordinating Center (CICC) will no longer pursue any plans to ban Roblox in the country after a meeting with law enforcement, the private sector and representatives from Roblox Corporation, after the company announced "enhanced safeguards" to ensure children's safety on the platform through reporting mechanisms, stringent monitoring and content controls.

On 20 August 2026, the Interior and Local Government Secretary (SILG) Jonvic Remulla, has been proposing and supporting the Roblox ban, following the shooting at Ateneo de Zamboanga University. Remulla expressed concern over violent content online (including video games) and its effects on youth. This however caused criticism and opposition from local developers and instead calls for a more targeted approach and stronger measures to ensure children's safety.

== See also ==
- Child safety on Roblox
