= Guilded =

Defunct online communications platform

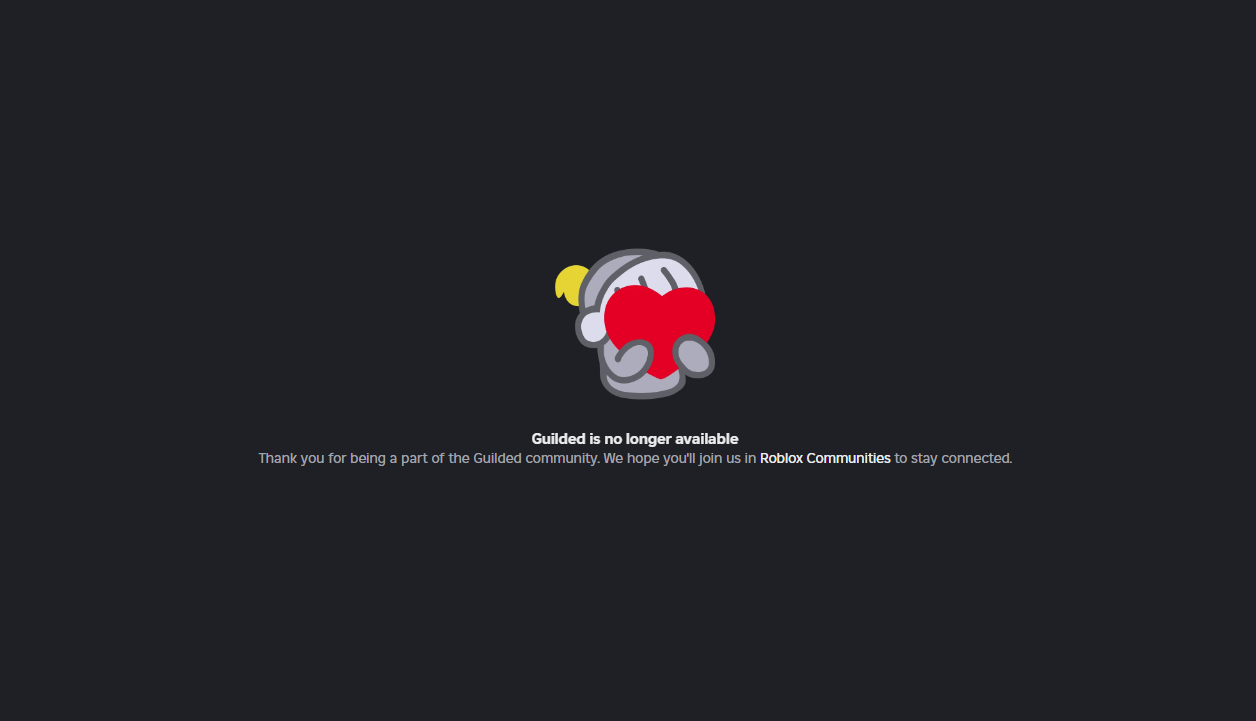
- Screenshot Screenshot of Guilded, 2026
- Original authors: Guilded, Inc.
- Developer: Roblox Corporation
- Release: March 17, 2017; 9 years ago
- Final release: v9.0.8 / December 19, 2025; 10 months ago
- Written in: Node.js
- Available in: English
- Type: VoIP communications, instant messaging, content delivery, collaborative software, and social media
- License: Proprietary
- Website: www.guilded.gg (defunct)
- Repository: github.com/TeamGuilded

Guilded was an American VoIP, instant messaging, and digital distribution platform designed & developed by Guilded, Inc. and was bought by Roblox Corporation on August 16, 2021, for $90 million with it now being considered an independent product group. From then until its shutdown, Guilded had been integrated with Roblox. The company was based in San Francisco.

Users communicated with voice calls, video calls, text messaging, media and files in private chats or as part of communities called "servers". Guilded was founded by Eli Brown, a former Facebook and Xbox employee. Guilded was available on Windows, Linux, macOS, Android, and iOS. On December 19, 2025, Guilded was retired by Roblox and now redirects visitors to Roblox Communities.

== Features ==
Guilded was a main competitor of Discord and primarily focused on video game communities, such as those focused on competitive gaming and esports. It provided features intended for video gaming clans, such as scheduling tools and integrated calendars.

The platform distinguished itself by offering higher performance specifications for free users compared to competitors, including 1080p resolution streaming at 60fps, 256kbps audio bitrate, and a 500MB file upload limit. In addition to standard communication tools, Guilded featured specialized organizational channels including "whisper" groups for nested voice chat, Kanban boards, and collaborative document editing similar to Google Docs.

== History ==
=== Account integration mandate ===
On May 31, 2024, Roblox Corporation announced that all current accounts must have a Roblox account linked before July 15, 2024, to continue using their Guilded account, while new users will only have the option to sign-up with Roblox. This requirement led to a departure of non-Roblox gaming communities, particularly independent MMORPG guilds and FPS clans, many of whom cited privacy concerns and a desire for platform neutrality as reasons for migrating back to Discord.

On October 12, 2024, Roblox Corporation restricted access for Guilded users in Russia, citing concerns that Guilded could be blocked in the country. Russian users reported receiving "403 Forbidden" errors due to changes in Amazon CloudFront configurations intended to comply with U.S. sanctions, which geoblocked the region without prior warning.

=== Discontinuation ===
On September 29, 2025, Roblox Corporation announced that Guilded would be retired by the end of 2025. Roblox stated the closure was part of an effort to unify social features into "Roblox Communities," a similar toolset integrated directly into Roblox. In the months leading up to the closure, the platform provided server owners with an export tool to archive message history and media.

On December 19th, 2025, the closure of the Guilded website and applications were finalized. The mobile apps were removed from app stores weeks later. The link now redirects visitors to the Roblox's Communities feature when going on Guilded. Upon the shutdown, the desktop and mobile applications ceased functionality, displaying only a "Sunset" notification on their screens.
