= Child safety on Roblox =

The safety of children on Roblox, a multiplayer game platform managed by the American video game company Roblox Corporation, has been the subject of much debate and controversy. Concerns include exposure to sexual content, sexual predation, political extremism, and financial exploitation, which have led to some countries banning the platform. As of August 2025, the corporation is facing several lawsuits in the United States for alleged failures to protect children.

Around 40% of Roblox players are under 13 years old, and Roblox Corporation stated in 2020 that half of all American children used the platform. Child exploitation groups such as 764 and CVLT have operated on Roblox to groom children, and at least 30 people have been arrested since 2018 in the United States for abducting or sexually abusing children they had groomed on the platform. Some users have taken to online vigilantism to catch potential child predators; Roblox Corporation has faced significant controversy after taking legal action against some of these users. Additionally, Roblox has been criticized for its use of microtransactions, advergames, and brand ambassadors, as well as for the alleged financial exploitation of child game developers.

Roblox Corporation has responded to some concerns by launching updates intended to boost child safety, and it employs about 3,000 moderators. In 2024, "social hangout" games were restricted to players over 13 years old, and the platform implemented parental controls automatically blocking direct messages to users under 13. The platform implemented a rehaul of its friend system with age verification through facial recognition or through a government-issued ID. Additionally, in 2025, social hangout games featuring private locations such as bedrooms and bathrooms were restricted to users aged 17 and above. Roblox also allows parents to disable in-app microtransactions and limit which games their children can play.

== Background ==
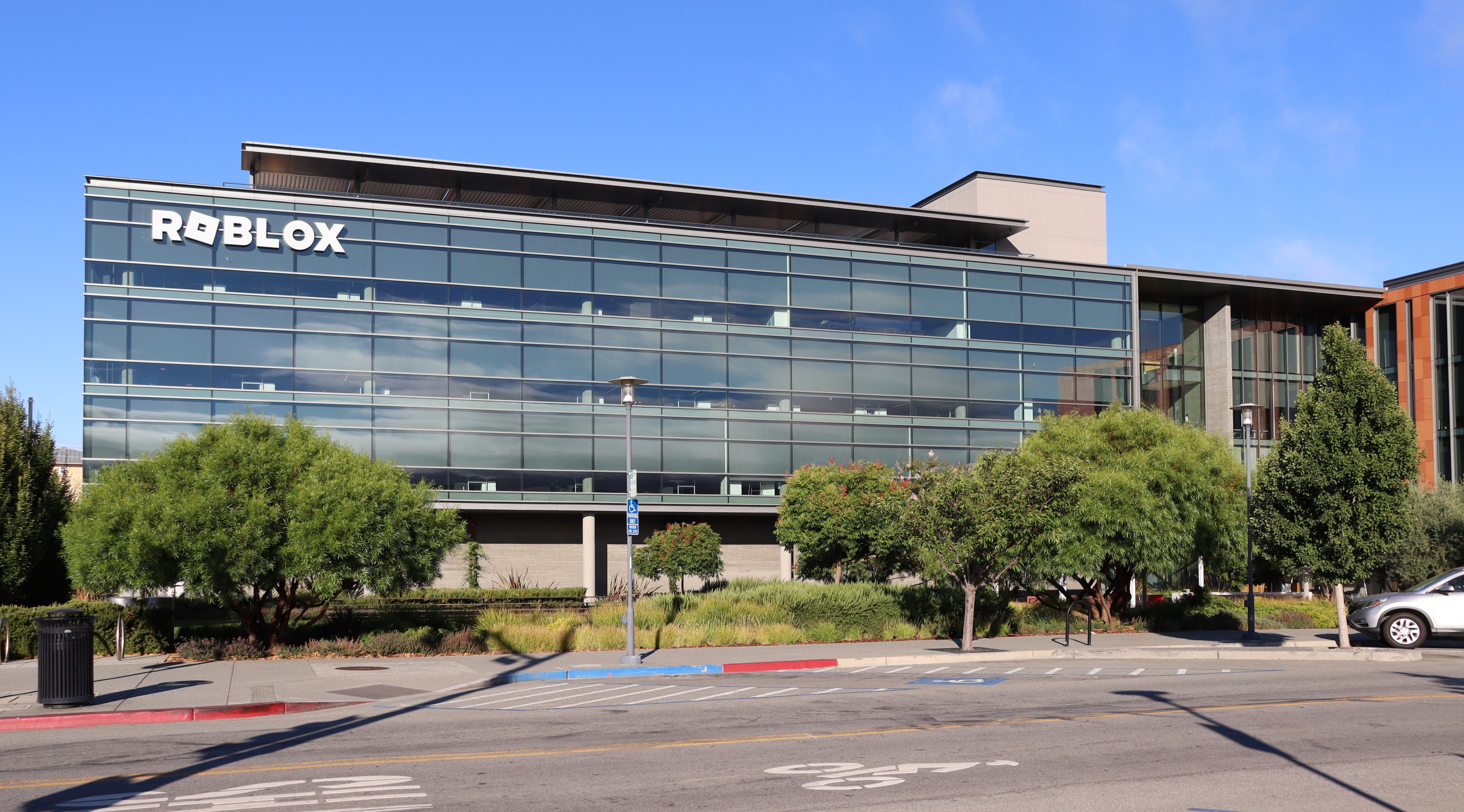
The headquarters of Roblox Corporation, the development company of Roblox

Roblox is an online game platform and game creation system developed and managed by Roblox Corporation, built around user-generated content and games, officially referred to as "experiences". Games can be created by any user through the platform's game engine, Roblox Studio, and then be shared to and played by other players. The games featured on Roblox vary in genre, from role-playing games to ones centered around escaping prison, among others. The platform is made to appeal to a family-friendly audience, and has been described as a massively multiplayer online game (MMO). While Roblox is free-to-play, it features a virtual currency known as "Robux" that can be purchased with real-world money. Robux can be used to purchase virtual items that the player can use on their virtual character (or "avatar") on the platform, or access experiences that require payment. Once a developer has accrued 30,000 Robux (exchangeable for about US$105), they may exchange the Robux for real-world currency through the Developer Exchange program.

In the second quarter of 2025, Roblox reported a daily active user count of over 100 million, its highest on record. A December 2017 study found that children ages 5 to 9 primarily spend their time playing Roblox over all other activities when using a PC. According to the company in 2020, the monthly player base included half of all American children under the age of 16. As of 2024, around 40% of all players are under the age of 13. Matt Kaufman is the chief safety officer at Roblox. The European video game content rating system PEGI classifies the game as "parental guidance recommended", while prior to September 2022 it classified the game as "suitable for 7 years and over". It cited the fact that the game hosts millions of instances of user-generated content which makes the platform difficult to classify as a whole. Similarly, the Entertainment Software Rating Board (ESRB) rates Roblox as "T for Teen", with the content descriptor "Diverse Content: Discretion Advised".

== Sexual predation ==
Online child exploitation groups such as 764, CVLT, and other groups affiliated with The Com have been discovered operating on Roblox, something which has been acknowledged by Roblox themselves. In 2022, a 13-year-old girl was kidnapped after a man, using Roblox, persuaded her to sneak out of her house. In 2024, Bloomberg Businessweek reported that, since 2018, at least 24 people had been arrested in the United States on charges of abducting or sexually abusing children they had groomed on Roblox. On June 25, 2025, Aftermath reported that 6 people had been arrested in the United States in connection to grooming on Roblox since the start of the year.

On December 13, 2021, the YouTube channel People Make Games released a video featuring an interview with an anonymous individual who maintained to be a victim of sexting with a 24-year-old Roblox game developer, who created the Sonic the Hedgehog fangame Sonic Eclipse Online, when she was 12. Although his account was terminated, he transferred the game to a friend's account and continued to make money from the game. Roblox refused action towards the game, as they did not see it as a safety concern; Sonic's owner Sega later took the game down via a copyright infringement notice after being notified. The developer would later be sentenced to 15 years in prison for paying an Uber driver to drive a 15-year-old child from Indiana to his home state of New Jersey for sex.

Users have been documented evading Roblox content and chat moderation to perform sexual content by taking activity offsite to other social media platforms, especially Discord. While some communities place age limits to prevent users from joining, applications obtained by Rolling Stone for players to "work" in adjacent sexual games on the platform showed that the large majority of users in these communities were under 15. Bloomberg Businessweek reported the existence of forums on the dark web sharing tips on how to encourage children to contact predators offsite without detection by chat filters through the use of intentional typos and emojis.

Sexual exploitation of minors on Roblox has been used to justify and promote the short-selling of Roblox Corporation's stock by organizations such as The Bear Cave (which compiled a list of 16 arrests and indictments since 2020 among other instances of sexual abuse) and the investment firm Hindenburg Research. Roblox has rejected claims made by these organizations, alleging that they were highlighting rare instances and that their promotion only served to further an agenda of causing others to sell stock. In March 2025, Roblox CEO David Baszucki said in response to concerns over child safety, "if you're not comfortable, don't let your kids be on Roblox". He stated in July 2025 that Roblox could serve as an effective online dating platform and that it could help lonely people meet in real life. The video game magazine PC Gamer described these statements as "tone-deaf". In November 2025 on the New York Times-affiliated podcast Hard Fork, Baszucki was asked his thoughts on "the problem of predators on Roblox," responding, "We think of it not necessarily just as a problem, but an opportunity as well."

In September 2025, Núcleo Jornalismo launched an investigation into Roblox content aimed at children in Brazil with the support of academics and researchers from various universities in São Paulo. They found that there was a significant amount of sexual content involving minors simulating explicit acts on the platform in order to obtain Robux. Núcleo journalists claimed that much of the platform is supported by microtransactions and uses methods to make minors addicted to online purchases to a certain extent, which can be used to abuse them.

In February 2026, the Boston FBI warned parents about an increase in online extremists targeting children via online games. The FBI disclosed that there are thousands of known cases nation-wide in which minors are victimized by online groups including 764 and others, whose ideology is known as "nihilistic violent extremism." Parents were advised that games like Roblox, Minecraft, and Call of Duty were being used by perpetrators to initiate contact with minors before switching to other platforms where extreme exploitation can take place.

In May 2026, child safety organizations Fairplay and the National Center on Sexual Exploitation filed a complaint against Roblox with the Federal Trade Commission (FTC). The request for investigation argues that by misrepresenting safety features and collecting data on young users, Roblox may have violated FTC laws regarding deceptive acts and child privacy. Roblox has disputed the claims.

=== Sex games ===
A BBC News screengrab of a "Roblox Condo", depicting two naked player characters with speech balloons stating "Who wanna sex [sic]" (left) and "Wanna date" (right)

A common criticism in regard to child safety on Roblox is the proliferation of games that depict sex clubs (usually termed "condo games" or "scented cons") that facilitate virtual sexual roleplay between users and how easily accessible they are to underage players. Underage teenagers have been identified as both taking part in and facilitating these games. Because such games are quickly moderated, these communities often rely on Discord servers, a third-party chat app, to alert their members when a new sex game appears. Violative users often signal their intent through veiled messages like "abc for girl" or "abc to control me", after which others can accept through private chat.

While not explicitly sexual, some games have been reported to feature suggestive environments that facilitate sexual or fetishistic roleplay such as vore or feet fetishes. Others may reference sexual memes like Rule 34. One prominent example is MeepCity, which was infamous for number of online daters inside the game and inappropriate clothing and actions found in the "party" feature. Rolling Stone profiled one 16-year-old girl who performed child prostitution as part of these games, who stated that she primarily did it for attention and secondarily for monetary gain via Robux. Individuals taking part in these games appear to overwhelmingly identify as part of vulnerable or marginalized demographics, namely those of queer or BIPOC communities. Sexual games on Roblox saw vastly increased use during the COVID-19 pandemic.

In 2025, Roblox invited one thousand developers to participate in an Easter egg hunt-themed Roblox event titled The Hatch. One controversial invitee was "TheOfficiaITeddy" who, according to IGN, was involved in making games that "featured romantic, dating, and even sex-themed content", with his most popular game having hundreds of millions of plays. This controversial addition begot the #BoycottTheHatch movement, which partly led numerous developers to decline to participate in the event. In response, Roblox announced on June 20 that they had removed TheOfficiaITeddy from The Hatch, and terminated his account on June 30.

==== Public Bathroom Simulator ====
Logo of the experience

In a Twitter thread reported on by Polygon, a woman stated that when she was investigating the Roblox games that her five-year-old child was playing, she joined a game named Public Bathroom Simulator. The game mimicked a "public restroom environment". The woman reported that her character slipped on a puddle and was stuck on the ground, at which point several other players roleplayed sexually assaulting her. She also reported that her character's pants often disappeared. Hindenburg Research cited a similar game, Public Bathroom Simulator Vibe, as one of the reasons Roblox is an "X-rated pedophile hellscape". In a 2025 lawsuit by the state of Louisiana against Roblox, the state also alleged that Public Bathroom Simulator Vibe was a sexually explicit game.

=== Anti-pedophile activism ===
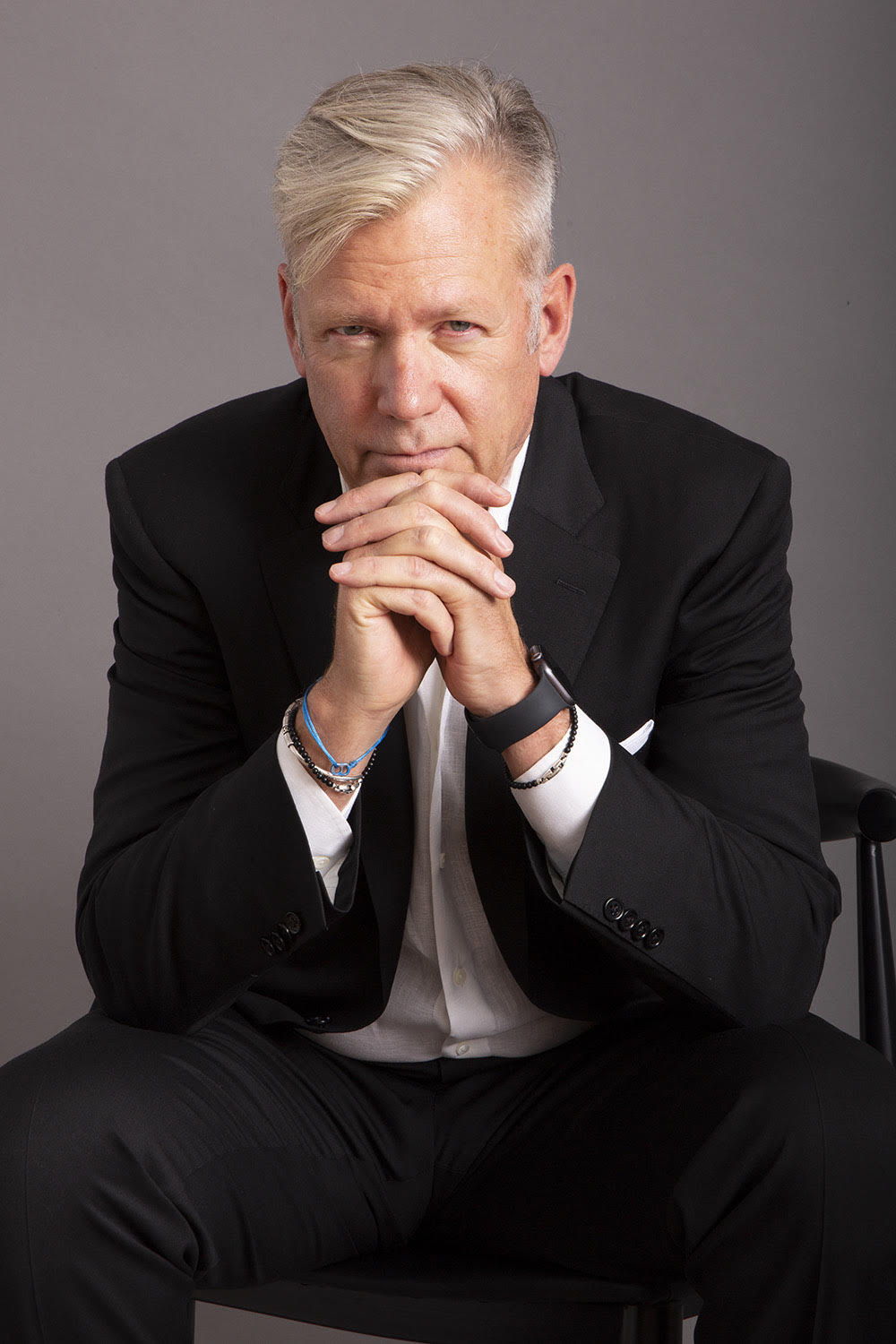
Chris Hansen, known for the television show To Catch a Predator, created a documentary film about the state of child safety on Roblox.

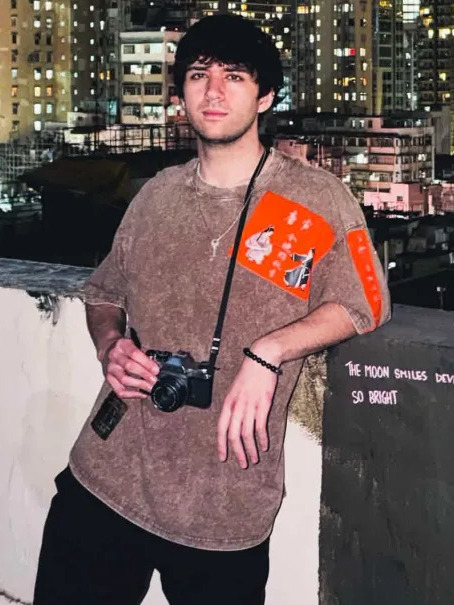
Ruben Sim, known for his YouTube channel criticizing Roblox, was sued by Roblox Corporation for $1.65 million in November 2021.

According to Bloomberg Businessweek, some Roblox users have become "vigilante gamers" in response to Roblox's perceived poor moderation and failure to protect children. Ben Simon, known online by the pseudonym Ruben Sim, pushed for action against the Sonic Eclipse Online developer, publishing screenshots of his alleged child rape fantasies and sending a video compiling allegations to a Roblox employee.

Although they terminated the developer's account four days afterwards, the Roblox Corporation later filed a $1.6 million lawsuit against Simon, alleging that he was the leader of a "cult-like cybermob" intending to damage the company's reputation, "posting false and misleading terrorist threats" during the Roblox Developer Conference 2021 which led to it being temporarily shut down, and that he was evading a previous ban on the platform for allegedly "harassing users and using racist and homophobic slurs, as well as for sexual harassment and uploading photos of Adolf Hitler". Simon denied trying to upload any images of Hitler, but admitted that he had previously been banned when he was 15 on an account with an inappropriate name he claimed was created as a joke as well as likely having used slurs in-game around the same age. Court documents show that the lawsuit was settled after Simon agreed to pay the Roblox Corporation $150,000 and a permanent ban from the game, notably not establishing a legal precedent for IP bans from the platform.

In August 2025, Roblox Corporation issued a cease-and-desist letter to Schlep, a YouTuber prominent for conducting sting operations against alleged online predators via the platform, which has resulted in multiple arrests. Roblox Corporation's letter stated that the activities of Schlep and other vigilante streamers were a violation of the platform's terms of service and created an unsafe environment for users. Concurrent with the legal notice, Roblox terminated all accounts associated with Schlep and his group, and IP-banned him from the platform. This has also prompted multiple Roblox-affiliated content creators of the Roblox Video Stars Program to leave the platform as protest. Following the controversy, Roblox Corporation's stock price fell by over 10%. The company's actions were met with major backlash from many online communities who viewed Schlep's actions as necessary for community policing. The situation escalated significantly days later and included calls for the CEO to resign and a petition by U.S. representative Ro Khanna. On August 15, Schlep said that he aims to counter-sue Roblox and that he had hired lawyers to fight its accusations.

American television journalist Chris Hansen, known for the television show To Catch a Predator, said in August 2025 that he was producing a documentary film about the state of child safety on the Roblox platform, and that he had interviewed law enforcement, abuse victims, and Schlep for the project. The documentary, Dangerous Games: Investigating Roblox — A Chris Hansen Special, was released on February 27, 2026, and is available exclusively on the subscription streaming platform TruBlu.

During the Roblox Developer Conference 2026, YouTuber Emathiio ran up to the stage while David Baszucki was presenting the opening keynote address. Emathiio revealed a shirt that read "KIDS DESERVE BETTER" while shouting "we deserve better, don't we deserve better" and was shortly tackled and escorted by security guards in front of the audience. Emathiio explained in a YouTube video why he did the stunt, stating that "My issue isn't with the people. I just do believe that Roblox [Corporation] isn't as dumb as they say they are... everybody's saying they don't want AI. Everybody's saying they don't want these faces messed up. Everybody wants better child safety. Every single slow year of progress is just another year where children are actually affected."

== Financial exploitation ==
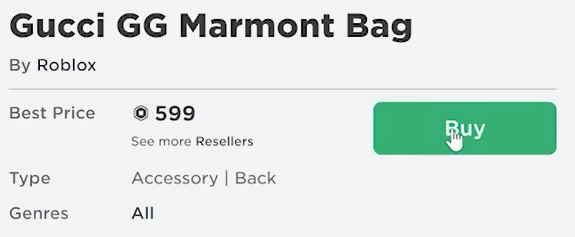
A People Make Games screengrab of the Roblox marketplace, which they criticized for not giving any warning before users spend real-world money

Roblox's business model has been heavily criticized, with the platform being accused of featuring exploitative practices that target children; Professor Jane Juffer at Cornell University accused Roblox of encouraging consumerism in children. Some found that the platform made it very easy to purchase microtransactions, leading to numerous instances where children have spent large sums of money on the platform without parents' knowledge.

Roblox hosts many games which feature loot boxes—consumable virtual items gives items based on random chance. Loot boxes have been criticized for promoting gambling towards children. Loot boxes are recommended by Roblox as one of the monetization strategies the developers may employ.

In April 2022, Truth in Advertising filed a complaint against Roblox with the Federal Trade Commission for false advertising, mainly failing to disclose when advertising is present, such as with advergames and brand ambassadors. As a response, Roblox hid advertisements from users under the age of 13 starting in March 2023. However, these restrictions did not apply to advergames, leading to further criticism by Truth in Advertising and children's digital rights organization 5Rights.

Investigative journalism YouTube channel People Make Games accused the platform of "exploiting" younger game developers by promising them large amounts of money from creating games, only to apply high revenue cuts and leaving creators with little to no income. They likened the platform's business model to a company scrip. After Roblox requested the channel to take down the video, People Make Games released several more accusations towards Roblox, focused on an alleged lack of oversight of developers and a method for people to address developer abuse, leading to child developers being exploited for labor on third-party platforms. They also criticized the platform's virtual economy, comparing the limited collectibles market to gambling.

== Political extremism and violence ==
A screengrab from The Australian, showing a recreation of a Nazi speech. Bypassed Nazi flags are shown in-game.

Roblox has been criticized several times for hosting politically extremist-related material. Examples of politically extreme content that has appeared on the platform throughout its history include content related to far-right ideologies such as neo-fascism and neo-Nazism, such as games that allow players to roleplay as Nazis or recreate real world massacres such as the Christchurch mosque shootings, the Columbine High School massacre and the Uvalde school shooting. Online child exploitation groups which operate on the platform like 764 and CVLT are also known to hold neo-Nazi and other extremist ideologies.

According to a 2022 report by The Weekend Australian, "dozens" of forums exist to show Roblox players how to make Nazi-inspired content without being banned, such as rearranging the colors of the Nazi flag and altering the Swastika. One high-profile group in Roblox, called "The Senate and People of Rome", outlawed "race-mixing, feminism" and homosexuality, while also requiring another player, who was Jewish, to wear a "Judea tunic or be arrested on sight". According to former members, the group's leader (who was styled as Führer) would occasionally ask high-ranking members to do things such as reading Schutzstaffel manuals or listening to far-right podcasts about a school shooter. The former members estimated that approximately one third of the group's leaders held overtly fascist beliefs.

A 2023 study by researchers from Pennsylvania State University analyzing discussion among users of the community noted that roleplaying games aligned with prejudiced or extremist values seemed to hide or only imply their values to players, occurrences of which usually took place in military roleplaying games. The same study also took notice of the genre of "hood games", in which players roleplay as gangsters in low-class neighborhoods, for promoting prejudice and stereotypes against African Americans and those of lower socioeconomic status. In-game mechanics for self-expression such as user avatars, item decorations, and spray paint tools were also identified as being used to spread extremist and hateful imagery.

On August 19, 2021, a stabbing and attempted mass murder occurred at Källeberg School in Eslöv, Sweden, when a 15-year-old student stabbed a person with a knife before attempting to commit suicide by cop after aiming an airsoft pistol at first responders. On January 10, 2022, a 16-year-old student attacked his school in Kristianstad, Sweden, armed with four knives, injuring two people. The perpetrators in both cases were in close contact with each other and communicated online. According to the Eslöv school stabbing perpetrator, the two were "blood brothers". They had met on Roblox and had been friends for around six years, communicating through various social media platforms and meeting in person four or five times.

In July 2025, an online cult called "Spawnism" emerged in the Roblox community centering around a fictional deity known as "The Spawn" originating from the popular game Forsaken; later, online predators would target vulnerable children to carve the cult's symbol on their skin, perform degrading acts on camera, and commit severe self-harm. All of these activities took place on Discord.

In March 2026, it was reported that the Roblox platform was used by the perpetrator of the 2026 Tumbler Ridge shooting to create experiences that simulated acts of violence, prompting the company to remove related content after facing backlash over how it was being used by criminals to incite violence among teenagers.

== Moderation and safety updates ==
External videos
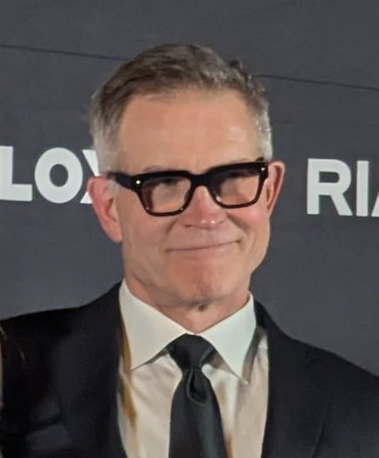
- David Baszucki, the CEO of Roblox Corporation
- Roblox: Update on Our Safety Initiatives
- We Asked Roblox's C.E.O. About Child Safety. It Got Tense.

In October 2020, the Roblox Corporation reported employing approximately 1,600 full-time employees dedicated to content moderation. By 2024, the number of moderators on the platform had increased to around 3,000. Roblox allows parents to disable in-app microtransactions and limit which games their children can play. Roblox developers are required to fill out a questionnaire which will determine the game's maturity rating, ranging from "minimal" to "restricted", which are only available to users who have verified they are at least 17 years old through government-issued ID.

On November 6, 2024, Roblox made an announcement to their developer forum that "social hangouts", specifically experiences meant for socialization rather than playing games, and games that allowed for users to draw on 2D canvases would no longer be allowed for users under 13. Developers would also need to designate their games as meant for users under 13, otherwise their games would no longer be accessible to those users. These restrictions were planned to take effect in 2025.

On November 18, 2024, Roblox announced that they would be implementing new safety features for children under 13 set to take effect in the first quarter of 2025. Specifically, they added new parental controls options that would block direct messaging to children outside of games, by default automatically blocking of direct messages in and outside of experiences to users under 13. They also reimplemented "experience guidelines" as "content labels" that parents could use with parental controls settings to regulate the content their child was allowed to see. By default, users under 9 were only allowed to access "minimal" and "mild" experiences, whereas "moderate" experiences would require parental consent.

In May 2025, Roblox hired Dr. Elizabeth Milovidov, a former Lego Group executive, to lead parental advocacy in the company. On July 17, 2025, Roblox announced that they would be reworking their friends list feature to consist of "connections" and "trusted connections". Players linked with a trusted connection would have chat filters removed between each other, specifically in hopes that users would be less likely to leave Roblox for platforms they did not moderate, but could only be accessed after using an AI-based age verification system using facial recognition. If the user's age could not be determined with high confidence after a facial scan, the platform would ask for the ID of the user or their parent. Teens who pass the age test would be able to add anyone aged 13 through 17 as a trusted connection without restriction, though users over 18 years old would need to use a QR code or phone number to add verified teen users.

In August 2025, Roblox announced that social hangout games featuring private spaces, such as bedrooms or bathrooms, would only be accessible to users who have verified they are at least 17 years old through government-issued ID. Roblox stated that this policy change was launched "earlier than we had planned". In September, Roblox announced it will collaborate with International Age Rating Coalition to assign age ratings to individual games, complementing Roblox's own ratings. Also in that month, Roblox disabled chat features in the Middle East in response to increased regulatory scrutiny in the region. In October 2025, Roblox planned revenue changes in order to expand child safety and moderation which caused the stock of the company to fall by 15 percent, though the company stated they expect a rising third quarter capital after the changes are made.

On November 18, 2025, Roblox announced that all forms of in-game chat and experiences rated "18+" on the platform would be locked behind an age verification system. The system requires users to either upload an ID to verify their exact age or perform a facial scan via Persona to place a person into an estimated age group. Chat on the platform is further limited to users in or near the specified age groups, with exceptions for "trusted connections", and is disabled by default for players under 9 years old unless overridden by an age-verified parent. This became mandatory in Australia, New Zealand, and the Netherlands on December 1, 2025, and became mandatory globally on January 1, 2026. This announcement was met with major backlash from parents, creators, safety advocates, and many online communities who feared it would put children at a greater risk. Just hours after taking effect, the system began to identify some children as adults and vice versa. Developers and players alike began revolting and demanding the platform to revert the update while also claiming that the system fails to tackle the flood of predators using the platform by having the system make it easier for them to target children. Developers also claimed that the verification system could not be trusted in the sense of how they may collect and store users' faces.

== Legal actions and regulation ==
=== Australia ===
In February 2026, several politicians in Australia called on the country's regulators to impose more restrictions on the platform after multiple cases of grooming. Among them was Minister for Communications Anika Wells, who had described the platform as "disturbing" after seeing how children could easily bypass the platform's security to access sexual content as well as experiences that promoted suicide and self-harm. She also requested that the game's PG rating be reviewed again by the Australian Classification Board, where it was noted that the platform hosted games intended for adults. Following the public backlash, senior Australian government officials called meetings with Roblox, where they indicated that if the company is unable to neutralize cases of child sexual abuse on its platform, it could face fines of A$49.5 million.

These decisions were made by the Australian government after receiving several reports of child grooming, where it was noted that the security measures imposed by the platform were not sufficient to protect minors. Additionally, it was indicated that the platform was originally excluded from the original Online Safety Amendment that banned social media for minors, but following the reports, it was decided to implement protocols for platforms such as Roblox, to be applied from March 2026.

On August 19, 2026, Australia's eSafety commissioner discovered adults were still able to see children's accounts (including profiles, account names and interests) and send connection (friend) requests without parental/guardian consent. Testing earlier in the year likewise revealed kids and adults could view and respond to one another's posts on forums outside Roblox games without parental/guardian consent. Roblox had committed themselves to make changes to prevent adults from communicating with random kids without parental/guardian consent, and strengthening account settings of kids so they are private by default. Roblox also committed to engaging a third-party auditor to assess and verify its safety measures, including an assessment of its age-estimation systems.

=== Asia ===
==== Central Asia ====
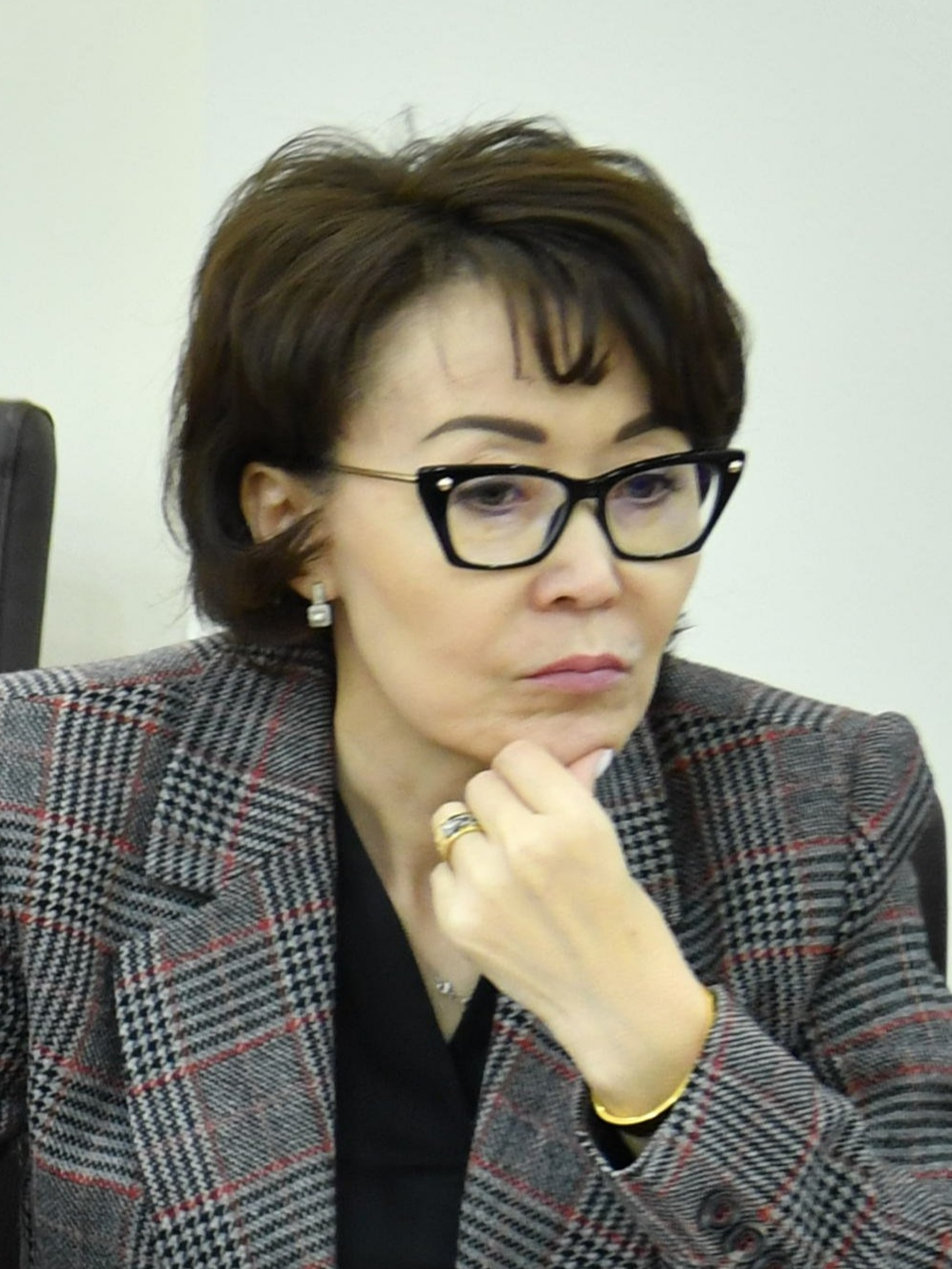
Unzila Shapak has been one of the members of the Majilis of the Parliament of the Republic of Kazakhstan who has advocated for the restriction of platforms such as Roblox in Central Asia.

In 2025, the Committee for Children's Rights Protection of the Ministry of Education of Kazakhstan issued a statement alerting parents to the presence of pedophiles on the platform. Subsequently, the General Directorate of Internal Affairs of the City of Bishkek in Kyrgyzstan issued a statement recommending that parents restrict minors' access to the platform.

In December 2025, Samat Alseiitov, the deputy head of the Criminal Investigations Department of the Kyrgyz Ministry of the Interior, supported the idea of banning the platform completely in the Central Asian country after receiving multiple reports from parents' associations noting that scammers were having private conversations with children with the aim of obtaining money and personal information to extort them in the future.

In January 2026, Kazakh MP Unzila Shapak proposed that the Kazakh government take action regarding Roblox's operations in the country, citing problems such as pedophilia and the presence of scammers requesting personal information from minors as being a problem. Shapak also pointed out that the platform had highly addictive elements marketed to minors, which could expose them to sexual or violent material at an early age and create certain dependencies to electronic devices. In the same month, Janybek Amatov, a member of the Kyrgyz parliament, raised restrictions on games marketed to children, such as Roblox and Minecraft, following the presence of pedophiles.

==== Southeast Asia ====
In August 2025, Indonesia requested that Roblox strengthen its chat filters to remove harmful content and enhance child safety, warning that failure to comply could result in a ban. Authorities in the city of Surabaya also imposed local bans on Roblox in primary and secondary schools, citing multiple incidents where sexual predators had harassed minors through the platform, following requests from the local Ministry of Education.

In November 2025, the Malaysian politician Lee Lam Thye proposed a government bill that would ban Roblox citing growing concerns about user safety and exposure to inappropriate content among children where the minister of the Ministry of Women, Family and Community Development, Nancy Shukri, stated the government was weighing the possibility of banning Roblox. Malaysian authorities cited that one of the reasons they are considering a national ban on the game is because it promotes violent and inappropriate content that could negatively influence and affect minors, following multiple reports from the Johor police confirming that a 9-year-old boy had seriously stabbed his brother due to his addiction to the platform.

During the same period, Fahmi Fadzil, Malaysia's communications minister, had previously confirmed to local media in October that he had noticed the platform was being used to promote violent behavior to minors and personally banned his children from using it. The minister emphasized that he had entered into talks with Roblox representatives in Southeast Asia and that one of the main topics of conversation was the stabbing incident that occurred in Johor that same month and how the platform has been hosting inappropriate games that could lead minors to aggressive behavior in Malaysia.

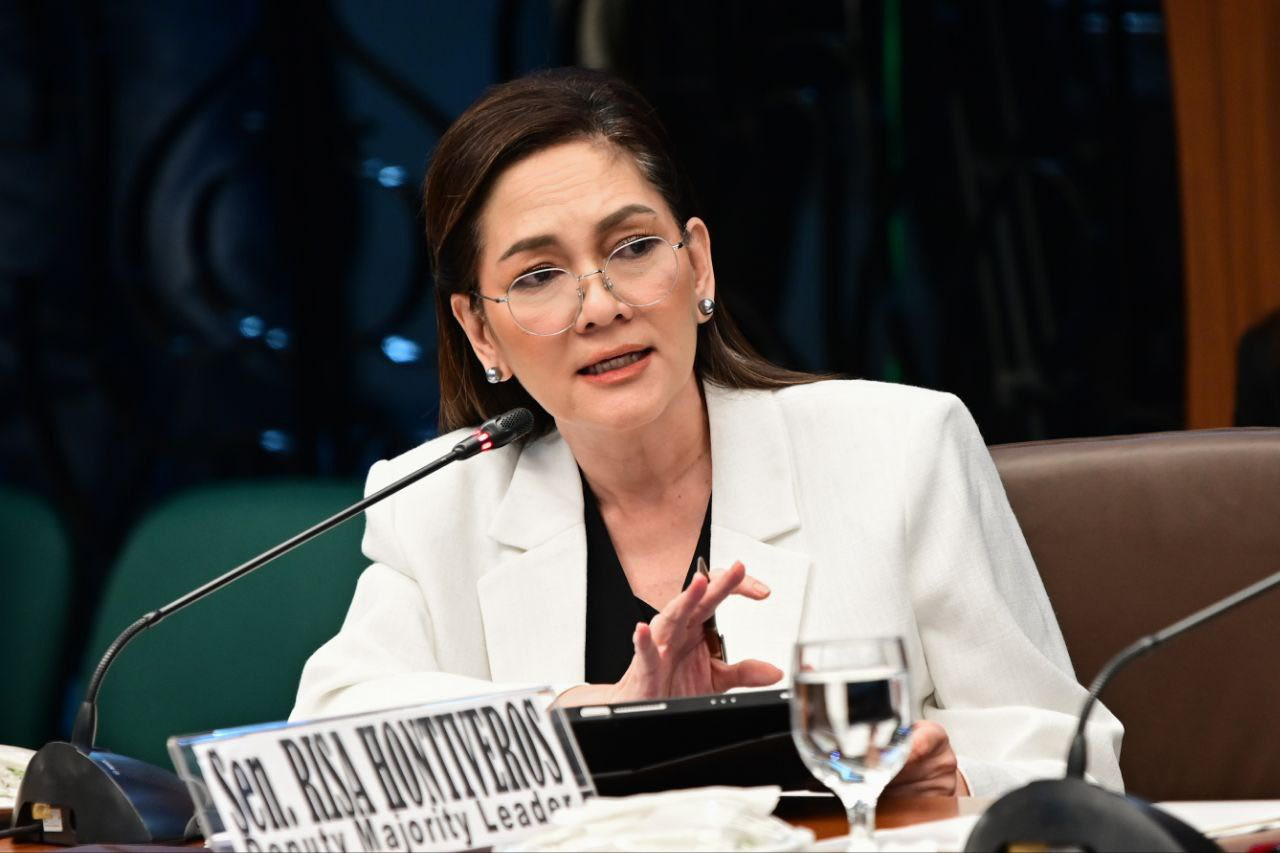
In March 2026, Senator Risa Hontiveros filed Senate Resolution No. 357 to investigate whether platforms such as Roblox were failing to maintain adequate controls to protect minors, alleging that the platform facilitated the distribution of child pornography and online grooming within the Philippines.

In March 2026, Philippine authorities began taking certain measures to restrict minors, citing that Roblox was hosting groups that promoted terrorism, where the Philippine National Police's (PNP) Anti-Cybercrime Group (ACG) had notified the public that children were sharing neo-Nazi and far-right content through the platform, and that certain entities on Roblox were promoting school shootings in Calabarzon. The CICC issued a 30-day ultimatum stating that if Roblox failed to comply with child protection laws, the platform could be blocked.

Another concern raised by Philippine authorities is that the platform was being used by child predator networks and was also being used to distribute drugs to minors in the country. Renato Paraiso, executive director of the CICC, urged Filipino parents to monitor their children's gaming activities due to the presence of child predators on popular platforms.

General Jose Melencio Nartatez Jr., Chief of the Philippine National Police, issued a statement alleging that Roblox was facilitating crimes involving minors in the Philippines, claiming that the platform was promoting the exploitation of minors as well as grooming.

On March 25, 2026, Philippine authorities decided to shorten the deadline to just 15 days after receiving multiple reports by Filipino parents that Roblox was facilitating terrorism and online sexual abuse, with the aim of pressuring the company to implement appropriate filters for children. In the same month, the CICC ordered the company to establish a physical office in the Philippines. Additionally, Philippine officials and journalists attempted to test the filters and found on several occasions that accounts designated for 7-year-olds could easily bypass the filters to access inappropriate content. The CICC also highlighted that Roblox was being used to distribute drugs and weapons, as well as child pornography. On April 7, the DICT announced that they and the CICC will no longer pursue any plans to ban Roblox in the country after a meeting with law enforcement, the private sector and representatives from Roblox Corporation, after the company announced "enhanced safeguards" to ensure children's safety on the platform through reporting mechanisms, stringent monitoring and content controls. In October 2026, the Mabalacat City Council, presided over by Vice Mayor Jun Castro, passed an ordinance banning the playing of the online game Roblox in all local computer shops and internet cafes. The local measure was enacted to protect students from violent digital content following a reported rise in school bullying and youth violence.

==== Middle East ====
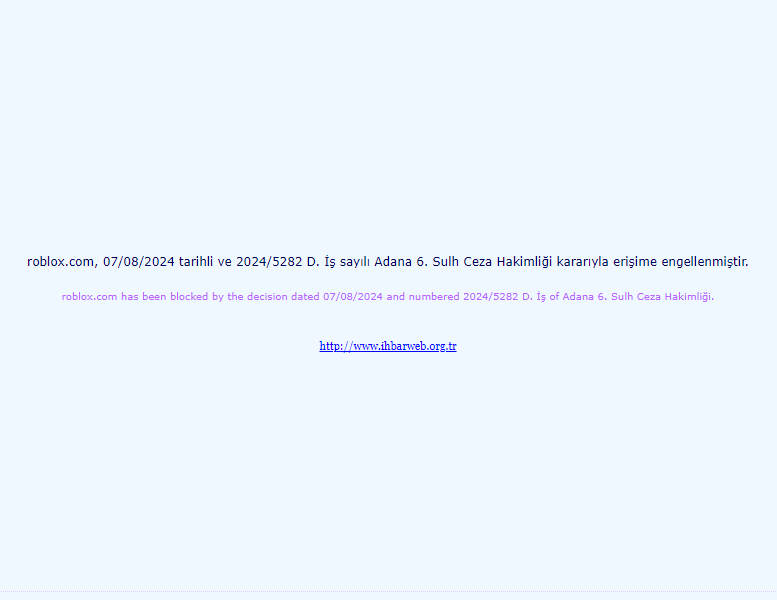
Education minister Yusuf Tekin defended the block of Roblox in Turkey by accusing it of "digital fascism".

In 2018, the United Arab Emirates temporarily banned the platform in the country, becoming the first country in the Middle East to do so. Later in 2020, authorities in Jordan imposed restrictions on access to the platform. During the same period, the Telecommunications Regulatory Authority of Oman banned access to the platform in the sultanate after multiple reports of inappropriate content being distributed by Roblox to minors. Turkey would ban the platform in August 2024 citing concerns that the content on the platform enabled child abuse.

In August 2025, concerns over child safety on the platform led to Roblox being banned in Qatar and Kuwait. In addition, members of Bahrain's parliament also began drafting a bill to ban Roblox in the country following concerns about child safety.

In October 2025, the Lebanese Association for Statistics, Training, and Development urged the Lebanese government to ban the video game following reports that 30% of minors in the country could be exposed to inappropriate content. That month, Iraq also banned the game, citing child safety and its incompatibility with "social values and traditions". In November 2025, the State of Palestine announced that it had banned Roblox to protect children digitally.

In February 2026, the Egyptian Supreme Council for Media Regulation passed a statement banning access to Roblox, with concerns being "internet and social media use among children". The council is currently worked with the National Telecommunications Regulatory Authority in its effort to enforce the ban. On February 3, the Egyptian government decided to completely ban the platform following a decision by the Supreme Council for Media Regulation (SCMR), which had determined that the platform's content posed significant risks to minors over "violent content".

=== Africa ===
In September 2025, Algerian authorities banned the game, citing that the company did not have sufficient tools and capacity to protect children, where the vast majority of Algerian users were under the age of 10 and were being exposed to sexual harassment and inappropriate content on the platform. In the same month, the Al-Azhar Fatwa Global Center became the first major Egyptian organization to warn parents that the Roblox platform was hosting a significant amount of inappropriate content from chats and games for minors, including Islamophobic imagery, and urged the Egyptian government to take action to restrict access to the platform in the country.

In September 2025, MP Touria Afife, a member of the Justice and Development Party, also supported the Moroccan government's monitoring of the platform after evaluating various reports, such as the one by Hidenburg Research, which describes Roblox as "Pedophile Hell", as well as the fact that many minors in Morocco were accessing the platform without protection, calling for investigations by the Ministry of Digital Transition and Administrative Reform. In December 2025, the Moroccan government took the first steps to moderate the platform and other online games after repeated warnings from several members of parliament who voiced their concern that the platform could be a danger to minors such as Fatima Zahra Afif. In addition, some members of the Moroccan parliament had been considering taking a much stronger approach to Roblox after authorities in neighboring Algeria had decided to ban it completely a few months earlier.

=== Europe ===
The Netherlands and Belgium have restricted certain games on the platform due to their regulations on in-game "loot boxes", which give out items based on random or unknown chances, to reduce children's exposure to gambling. In 2025, the Danish Gambling Authority released reports detailing how Roblox is exploiting and financially abusing children through its Robux currency, noting that the platform was employing tactics similar to those used by betting sites targeting minors.

In October 2025, the Attorney General's Office in Lleida, Catalonia, Spain, launched a series of investigations following several reports from parents whose children had been harassed through Roblox. In addition, the Spanish Civil Guard also issued a statement saying that reports of sex offenders using Roblox to extort minors were becoming much more frequent in Spain, where they recorded cases of several minors in Murcia who had begun to interact and maintain direct contact with pedophiles in southern Spain. In the same month, the Dutch government began reviewing Roblox over child safety concerns.

In December 2025, access to Roblox was blocked in Russia due to it allegedly containing extremist material and "international LGBT propaganda", with Roskomnadzor saying that the platform was "rife with inappropriate content that can negatively impact the spiritual and moral development of children".

In January 2026, the Netherlands Authority for Consumers and Markets (ACM) launched investigations to probe whether the platform was safe in the European Union after multiple reports and lawsuits claiming that the platform was a danger to minors. In the same month, Sarah El Haïry, the High Commissioner for Children (Haute-commissaire à l'Enfance), publicly stated that issues such as pedophilia and sexual harassment on the platform were causing concern among French regulators. El Haïry also emphasized that the conversation about protecting children online should also include video games and not just social media in general. On January 8, the Human Rights Commission of the Republic of Azerbaijan (Ombudsman) issued a public appeal to parents, expressing concerns that the platform is promoting cyberbullying and grooming of minors, and stating that parents should begin restricting access to Roblox due to the ineffectiveness of existing filters in protecting children on the platform.

On March 19, 2026, the Azerbaijan State Committee on Family, Women, and Children’s Affairs met with company representatives to express serious concern about how the platform was negatively impacting the mental health and safety of minors in the country. The committee stated that the company was not implementing sufficient safeguards and tools to protect minors, and considered blocking access to the platform in the country following multiple violations of local laws. The next day, on March 20, 2026, two petitions submitted by representatives from Latvia and Greece respectively were deemed admissible by the European Parliament on the grounds that the Roblox platform was not implementing adequate security measures for minors, noting that the tools on the platform were not sufficiently effective.

=== Latin America ===
Throughout the 2020s, the cyber police divisions of several Mexican states have reported numerous cases of sexual harassment of minors through Roblox, including the federal government of Chihuahua, which from 2021 to 2025 reported an increase in cases of grooming using the platform. Other federal governments, such as Coahuila and Nuevo León, sent communications to parents stating that Roblox was being used to extort minors. Meanwhile, in 2024, the Mexico City Cyber Police and the Secretariat of Citizen Security (SCC) also reported that Roblox was being used to promote criminal activity such as the distribution of drugs and illicit substances to minors in the Mexican capital.

The government of Guatemala issued a warning about the platform to parents in 2021.

Between 2023 and 2024, the Public Ministry of Labor (Ministério Público do Trabalho) of Sao Paulo launched an investigation into monetization on the platform and how the American company was taking advantage of young developers in Brazil, where the company did not provide them with proper payment for their work. Roblox had previously clarified to the Federal Government of São Paulo that its monetization model was not abusive and that minors had previously consented to the platform monetizing their content. However, this response caused some disagreement with Luísa Carvalho Rodrigues, representative of Coordinfância (Coordenadoria Nacional de Combate à Exploração do Trabalho da Criança e do Adolescente lit. National Coordination for Combating the Labor Exploitation of Children and Adolescents), the branch of the Public Ministry of Labor that regulates child labor in Brazil, quoting "Just because it's fun doesn't mean it's not work, if the requirements of an employment relationship are met." following investigations comparing it to child labor in the Brazilian state regarding the platform monetization and corcerns from parents.

In October 2024, the Panamanian Police issued a public statement about "Operación Roblox" in Puerto Caimito in the District of La Chorrera, where Panamanian authorities in collaboration with Spanish cybercrime intelligence, coordinated investigative efforts to dismantle a pedophile network that produced child pornography through the extortion of minors using Roblox social features. Within the same month, Venezuelan authorities noted that Roblox was being used by local pedophile networks to extort minors. The Division of Cybercrime of the Scientific, Penal, and Criminal Investigations Corps (CICPC) was the first Venezuelan government organization to issue a national statement warning that the platform was not safe and that parents should monitor their children's chats.

In August 2025, the Defensoría del Pueblo de la Provincia de Catamarca informed parents in the Argentine province that the platform's security was insufficient to protect minors and that in recent years cases of sexual harassment of minors were becoming more frequent in the province thanks to Roblox. Between September and December 2025, authorities in the states of Santa Catarina and Rio Grande do Sul informed parents that the platform was being used by pedophile networks to solicit sexual and self-harm videos from minors in exchange for Robux in cities in southern Brazil.

In November 2025, the Ministry of Education of the City of Buenos Aires in Argentina issued an indefinite block on the platform on public school computers after receiving multiple reports of grooming. The Ministry of Education made this decision after a case of child exploitation in which the platform was being actively used by pedophiles based in the city of Cipolletti, who requested intimate photos of minors in exchange for Robux. Following the platform ban in Buenos Aires, the secretaries of public education in the provinces of Córdoba, Mendoza and Misiones issued regional bans on Roblox on all public school devices after multiple reports of grooming and child harassment.

Following the implementation of the Felca Law in March 2026, Brazilian regulators have classified Roblox as an 18+ game due to its use of microtransactions, which are likened to online gambling, and to prevent potential addiction among minors. Following the enforcement of the law, the company entered into discussions with the Brazilian Ministry of Justice to reassess the game's rating, given that the platform is primarily used by minors in the country.

=== United States ===
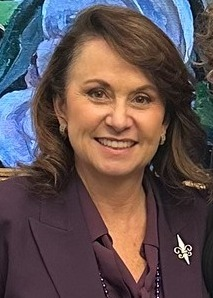
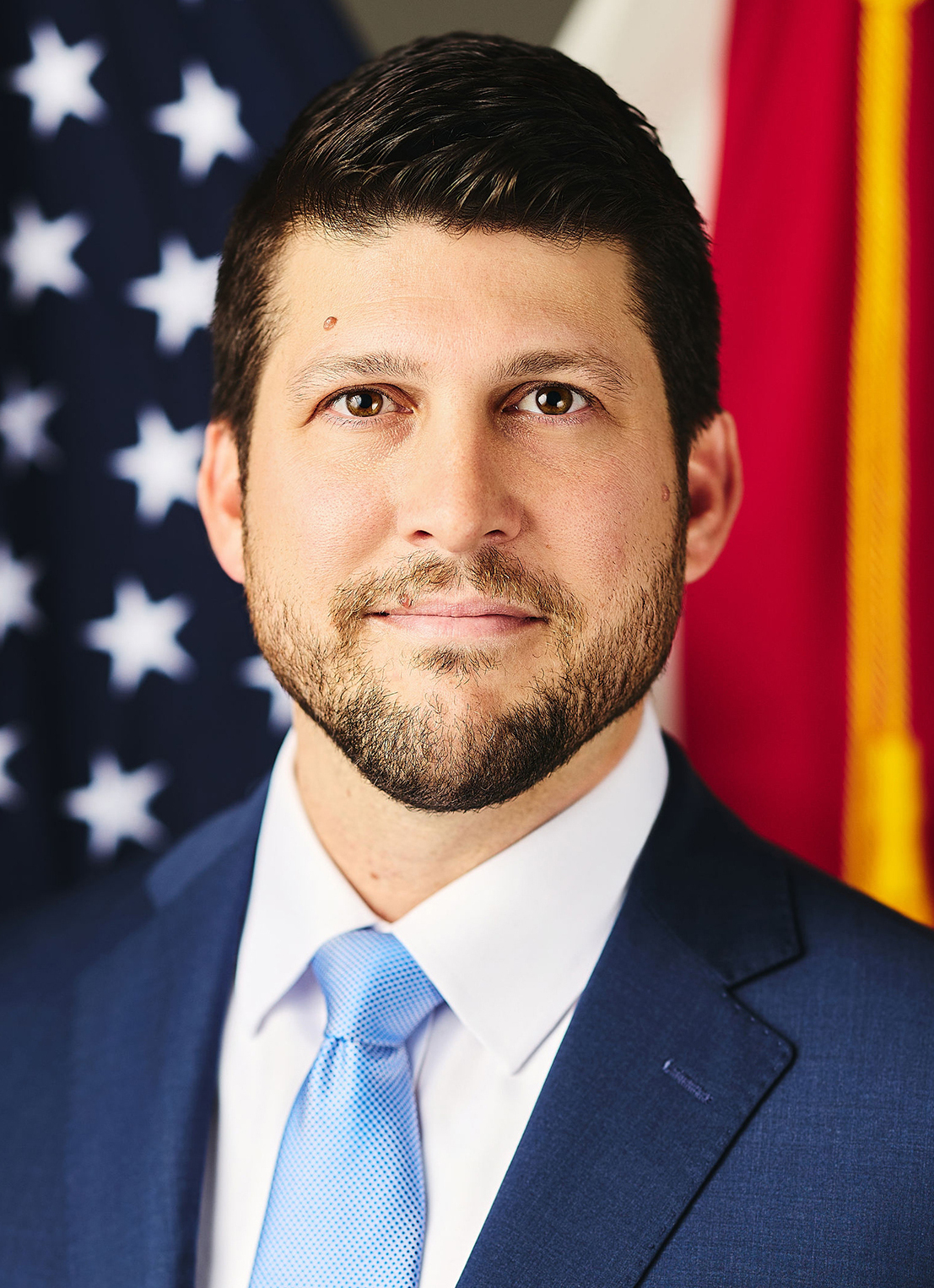
Liz Murrill of Louisiana and James Uthmeier of Florida were the first two American attorneys-general to take legal action against Roblox Corporation over child safety concerns.

In October 2022, a lawsuit was filed by a parent in the San Francisco Superior Court. The lawsuit alleges that Roblox connected their daughter with online predators, who sexually exploited her by coercing her to send sexually explicit photos to them on Discord and Snapchat; those corporations were also named in the lawsuit.

In August 2023, a class-action lawsuit was brought against Roblox Corporation. The lawsuit alleges that Roblox profited off of minors when they bought Robux to participate in third-party gambling rings, violating the RICO act. That same month, a different class action lawsuit was filed by parents against Roblox for false advertising, exposing children to sexual content, and enabling children to spend large amounts of their parents' money on Robux.

Throughout 2025, Roblox became the target of multiple lawsuits from various state Attorneys General regarding failures to maintain the safety of children on their platform. This started with Louisiana in August before growing to include Kentucky in October, Texas in November, and both Iowa and Tennessee in December. Investigations by attorneys-general also took place throughout the year, including Florida issuing subpoenas (including criminal ones) to Roblox in April, Oklahoma seeking external law firms to investigate Roblox over failures in child safety in September, and South Carolina initiating a formal investigation in December.

In February 2025, Bloomberg News reported that Roblox was under investigation by the U.S. Securities and Exchange Commission for unknown reasons. From February to May 2025, law firm Anapol Weiss filed four different lawsuits against Roblox on behalf of children for alleged exploitation by adults. The law firm stated it was "investigating hundreds of similar cases" and intended to file more lawsuits in the subsequent months. Roblox stated they could not comment on ongoing litigation per company policy. On October 30, 2025, a family in Miami-Dade County, Florida filed a lawsuit against both Roblox and Discord citing allegations of failing to protect and maintain the safety of their 11-year-old daughter from a pedophile after the pedophile met her on Roblox and turned communications off-platform to Discord.

In February 2026, Georgia Attorney General Chris Carr launched an investigation into Roblox following instances and reports of child exploitation. Los Angeles County also filed a lawsuit against Roblox, claiming the platform "makes children easy prey for pedophiles" and "fail[s] to implement reasonable and readily available safety measures". On March 4, 2026, Nebraska Attorney General Mike Hilgers filed a lawsuit against Roblox, accusing the platform of becoming a "playground" for child predators and misleading parents and guardians about the safety precautions taken on the platform.

On April 15, 2026, a settlement was reached with the state of Nevada, as it was in preparation to file a lawsuit claiming the platform lacked basic features to protect children from predators and exploitation. Roblox agreed to pay $10,000,000 supporting children's programs in Nevada over the next three years, as well as $2,500,000 on an awareness campaign regarding child safety online and a staff law enforcement liaison.

On April 21, 2026, it was announced that settlements had been reached in Alabama and West Virginia, which required Roblox to implement age verification and restrict chat for users under 16. Roblox agreed to pay a total of over $23,000,000 to both states. West Virginia Attorney General JB McCuskey stated that the settlement came from the state's investigation into Roblox, which found that the platform exposed the youth to predators, grooming, and sexual and violent content. McCuskey and his office stated that the $11,080,000 would be used for West Virginia's child safety and consumer protection programs, while Alabama stated that their $12,200,000 would be used to fund school resource officers across the state. Alabama will receive ‌$5,000,000 more if Roblox violates the terms of the settlement over the next four years.

On May 7, 2026, Indiana filed a 70-page lawsuit against Roblox and Discord. Attorney General Todd Rokita alleged the platforms has not made sufficient measures to protect children against predators online, and the effectiveness of the safety features that were released “remain to be seen”, with sexually explicit content accessible on the platform. The lawsuit said predators formed online friendships with children before attempting to exploit them, with the "Robux" currency empowering predators. The companies were accused of violating the Indiana Deceptive Consumer Sales Act by failing to employ adequate safeguards for children and warnings for parents and guardians about objectionable content and misrepresenting the safety of their platforms.

On May 26, 2026, the Attorney General of Connecticut William Tong announced that the state of Connecticut was opening an investigation into Roblox regarding its parental controls and usage demographics, after frequent reports that Roblox was being used for child exploitation.

On June 22, 2026, the Attorney General of Arkansas Tim Griffin sued both Discord and Roblox for engineering a child safety problem. He stated that Roblox has built a platform with no age verification, no meaningful parental/guardian consent, and an algorithm that led kids directly toward the spaces where online predators were at. He stated that both Discord and Roblox knew of what had transpired on their platforms, and that the companies cared more about profit and money compared to safety of kids. He also stated that both Discord and Roblox told children's parents and guardians that their platforms were safe and not dangerous, while in reality, "Roblox left the front door unlocked, and Discord handed predators a private room". On the same day, an agreement was reached between Roblox and Lynn Fitch, the Mississippi Attorney General. The settlement required Roblox to pay $9,000,000 to fund digital literacy education, as well as creating a fully-funded parental empowerment and education program. The settlement included additional damages of $5,000,000 to ensure Roblox's compliance.

On July 13, 2026, a settlement was reached between Roblox and South Dakota. The settlement requires all users to undergo age verification via government ID or facial scan, to guarantee kids only have access to appropriate content based on their age. Roblox is also expected to pay $8.6 million, with $5 million going to the Department of Education, $2.6 million going to the ICAC and $1 million going to the Consumer Protection Fund, these amounts must be paid by July 2030. Out of the $5 million going to the DOE, $1 million must go to after school programs. Roblox must also make a two-year awareness campaign focusing on online child safety to be designed to reach a South Dakotan audience. If Roblox breaches the settlement, the state may get more funds from Roblox. Roblox also must issue an annual report verifying the funding is paid out.

On July 23, 2026, an Oregon woman filed a lawsuit against Roblox, claiming the platform allowed child predators to groom children, which included the woman when she was 9 years old.

On August 10, 2026, the Attorney General of Ohio Andy Wilson began to initiate a class-action lawsuit against Roblox. Wilson stated that Roblox lied to investors and failed to guard kids from online predators. The deception would cause the Ohio Public Employees Retirement System and the State Teachers Retirement System to lose $12,500,000 from investment.

On August 13, 2026, two United State senators, Dick Durbin and Josh Hawley would announce an investigation into Roblox, claiming the company perferring revenue and engagement metrics over kids safety. Matt Kaufman responded, stating that Roblox doesn't compromise safety and that they look forward to sharing the facts. The senators requested Roblox to give documents relating to child safety, child sexual or physical abuse, child bullying, or child financial exploitation by August 31.
