= David Baszucki =

American entrepreneur (born 1963)

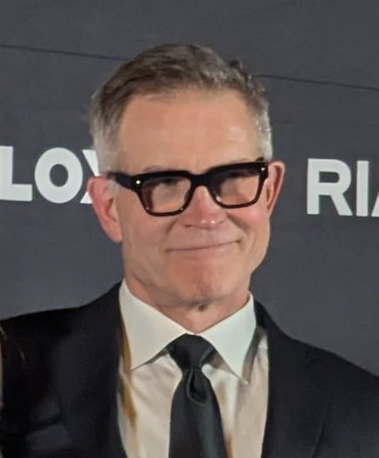
- Baszucki in 2025
- Born: David Brent Baszucki; January 20, 1963 (age 63); Winnipeg, Manitoba, Canada
- Other name: Builderman
- Education: Stanford University (BS)
- Occupations: Entrepreneur; engineer; software developer
- Years active: 1989–present
- Known for: Co-founder of Roblox
- Title: CEO of Roblox Corporation
- Spouse: Jan Ellison (m. 2005)
- Children: 4
- David Baszucki's voice David Baszucki discussing Roblox; Recorded 2018

David Brent Baszucki (/bə.ˈzuː.ki/, buh-ZOO-ki; born January 20, 1963) is a Canadian-American businessman. He is co-founder and CEO of Roblox Corporation. He co-founded and was the CEO of Knowledge Revolution, which was acquired by MSC Software in December 1998. As of September 2026, Forbes estimated his net worth at $3.1 billion USD.

== Life and education ==
David Brent Baszucki was born on January 20, 1963, in Winnipeg, Manitoba, Canada, to Helen and Paul Baszucki, who met at the University of Saskatchewan before moving to Eastern Canada and the United States. Both of Baszucki's parents were descended from Ukrainian immigrants who had settled in Western Canada. He grew up in Eden Prairie, Minnesota. As a child, he was interested in dirt bikes, go-karts, and science fiction. He attended Eden Prairie High School, where he was the captain of his high school TV quiz team.

Baszucki then studied engineering and computer science at Stanford University. While there, he did a summer internship at General Motors where he worked in a lab focused on controlling car engines with software. He graduated in 1985 as a General Motors Scholar in electrical engineering. Before founding Roblox, he hosted a libertarian talk radio show for KSCO Radio Santa Cruz. Baszucki lives in the San Francisco Bay Area with his wife, novelist Jan Ellison, and their four children.

== Career ==
=== Knowledge Revolution ===
In the late 1980s, David Baszucki, together with his brother Greg Baszucki, founded the company Knowledge Revolution and developed and distributed a physics based simulation called "Interactive Physics", an educational supplement that simulates 2D physics experiments. As a follow-up to Interactive Physics, Knowledge Revolution launched the mechanical design software Working Model in the early 1990s.

In December 1998, Knowledge Revolution was acquired by MSC Software, a simulation software company based in Newport Beach, California, for $20 million. Baszucki was named vice president and general manager of MSC Software from 2000 to 2002, but he left to establish Baszucki & Associates, an angel investment firm. Baszucki led Baszucki & Associates from 2003 to 2004. While an investor, he provided seed funding to Friendster, a social networking service.

=== Roblox ===
David Baszucki is the co-founder and current CEO of Roblox and the Roblox Corporation. In December 2003, Baszucki,—along with Erik Cassel—who worked as Baszucki's VP of Engineering for Interactive Physics – began working on an early prototype of Roblox under the working title eBlocks, then later GoBlocks, then DynaBlocks. It was later renamed Roblox, a portmanteau of "robots" and "blocks", in January 2004. The website was launched in 2004, whilst the actual Roblox game was officially released on September 1, 2006. In a June 2016 interview with Forbes, Baszucki stated that the idea for Roblox was inspired by the success of his Interactive Physics and Working Model software applications, especially among young students.

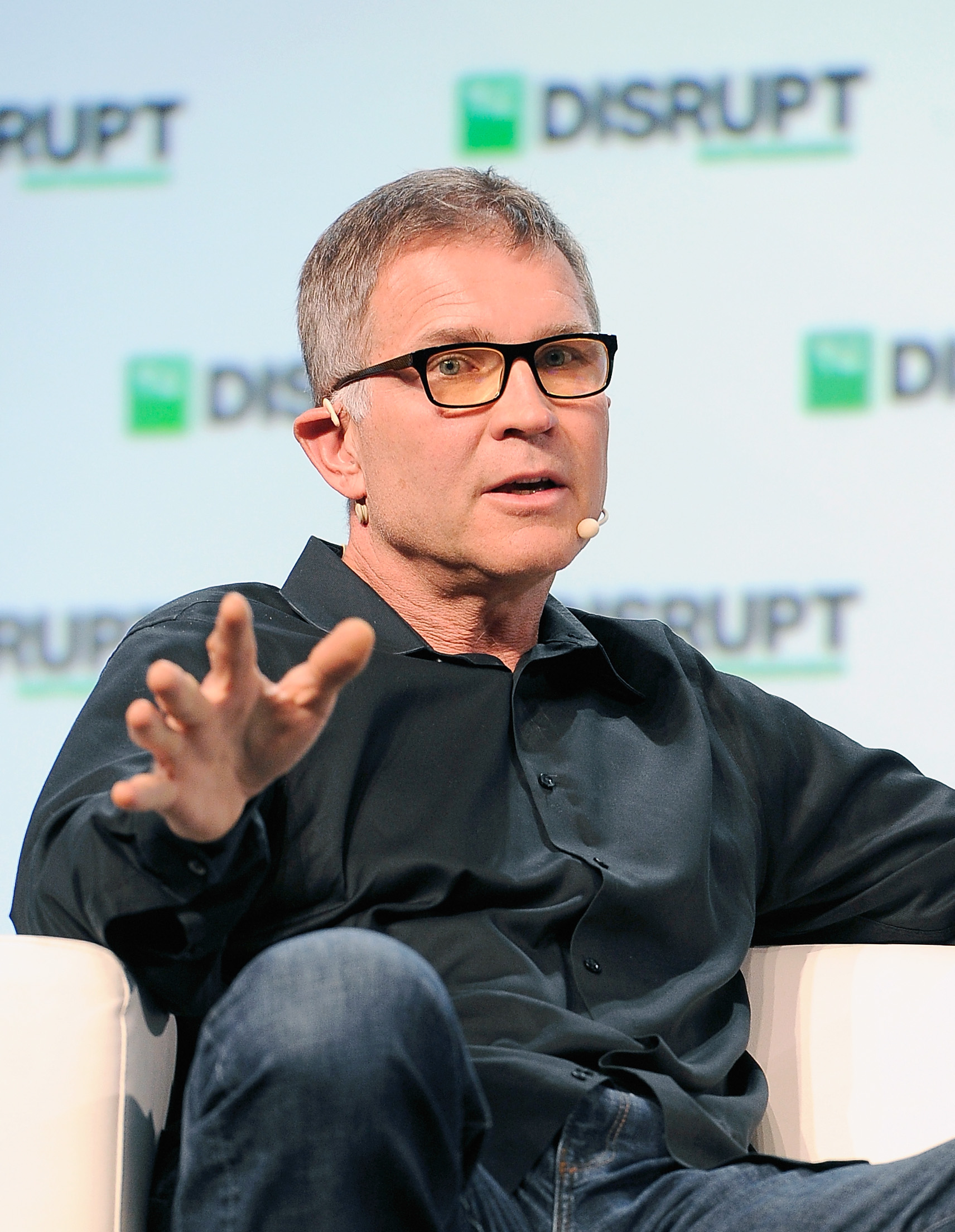
Baszucki in 2018

Baszucki owns a roughly 13% stake in the Roblox Corporation, the company that owns Roblox, a stake estimated to be worth around $470 million as of 2020. He said he would donate any future compensation he earns from Roblox's listing on the New York Stock Exchange for philanthropic purposes. In December 2021, a New York Times investigation alleged that he and his relatives used a tax break intended for small business investors in order to legally avoid tens of millions of dollars in capital gains taxes. According to Business Insider, Baszucki was the seventh-highest-paid CEO in 2021, making $232.8 million.

In March 2025, he said in response to concerns over child safety on Roblox, "if you're not comfortable, don't let your kids be on Roblox". He stated in July 2025 that Roblox could serve as an effective online dating platform and that it could help lonely people meet in real life. The video game magazine PC Gamer described these statements as "tone-deaf". Following the banning of predator hunter Schlep from Roblox on August 9, 2025, a Change.org petition calling for the resignation of Baszucki reached over 100,000 signatures.

=== Other activities ===
In March 2021, after Roblox's listing on the New York Stock Exchange, Baszucki and his wife launched the Baszucki Group, a philanthropic organization, and started the Baszucki Brain Research Fund to provide grants to bipolar research programs. In December 2021, the University of California, San Francisco launched the Baszucki Lymphoma Therapeutics Initiative, with $6 million in donations from Baszucki over five years, to increase the effectiveness and availability of chimeric antigen receptor T-cell therapy for lymphoma patients. In September 2022, Baszucki, Google cofounder Sergey Brin, and Keystone Capital chairman Kent Dauten donated a combined $150 million toward bipolar disorder research and treatment.

In December 2025, The New York Times reported that Baszucki donated at least $2.5 million to the construction of the White House State Ballroom. The Washington Post reported in October 2026 that the Baszucki family's Baszucki Gift Fund had donated $5 million for the ballroom's construction. In 2026, Baszucki and his wife contributed $156,800 to the 2026 California gubernatorial campaign of Matt Mahan.
