= Erik Cassel =

American software developer and entrepreneur (1967–2013)

- Cassel in 2011
- Born: Erik Stefan Cassel; December 16, 1967; United States
- Died: February 11, 2013 (aged 45); San Francisco, California, U.S.
- Education: Cornell University
- Occupations: Entrepreneur; engineer; software developer
- Years active: 1990–2013
- Known for: Co-founder of Roblox Corporation
- Title: Chief Scientist of Roblox
- Spouse: Rebecca Smith (before 2013)
- Children: 2

Erik Stefan Cassel (December 16, 1967 – February 11, 2013) was an American entrepreneur, engineer, and software developer. He was best known as the co-founder of Roblox Corporation, alongside David Baszucki, and served as the company's chief scientist. Cassel was involved in the development of Roblox from its earliest prototypes until his death in 2013.

== Early life and education ==
Erik Stefan Cassel was born on December 16, 1967, in the United States to David and Edith Cassel. In a 2010 interview, he recalled being introduced to computers by his father at a young age. He later began programming on a TRS-80 computer while in junior high school, writing games during school recess. He attended Ithaca High School (Ithaca, New York), graduating in 1985. He received the S. Carolyn Marsh Award for Senior Orchestra. He was a member of Boy Scouts of America Troop 19 for seven years and received the Eagle Scout Award, the organization's highest rank.

Cassel attended Cornell University and studied physics. As a student, he developed the first data analysis software used in Cornell's introductory physics laboratory experiments and completed a course project that combined physics and computer graphics. He also spent a year in Germany as part of a student exchange program.

== Career ==
=== Knowledge Revolution ===
After graduating from Cornell, Cassel joined Knowledge Revolution, an educational software company founded by David and Greg Baszucki. He later became vice president of engineering at the company.

Knowledge Revolution developed educational and engineering simulation software, including Interactive Physics. In December 1998, the company was acquired by MSC Software for $20 million. Baszucki and Cassel subsequently held senior positions at MSC Software before leaving the company and beginning work on what would become Roblox.

=== Roblox ===
In the early 2000s, Cassel teamed up with Baszucki, and began developing an early prototype of Roblox. The project was initially known as "eBlocks" and later "DynaBlocks" before being renamed Roblox. The two worked together from an office in Menlo Park, California, developing the early versions of the platform.

Roblox was formally released on September 1, 2006. Cassel served as chief scientist at Roblox. In a 2010 interview, he said that he had written the framework that made Roblox scriptable and worked on integrating the Lua programming language with the platform's game elements.

Cassel said that one of his favorite aspects of working on Roblox was seeing what its community created. He recalled early players discovering unexpected ways to build and interact within the game, which he described as one of the things that made working on Roblox enjoyable.

== Personal life and death ==
Cassel was married to Rebecca Smith Cassel, with whom he had two sons. Cassel's interests outside of programming included cooking, bicycling, playing the violin, ultimate Frisbee, and woodworking.

Cassel died of cancer on February 11, 2013, in San Francisco, at the age of 45.

== Legacy ==
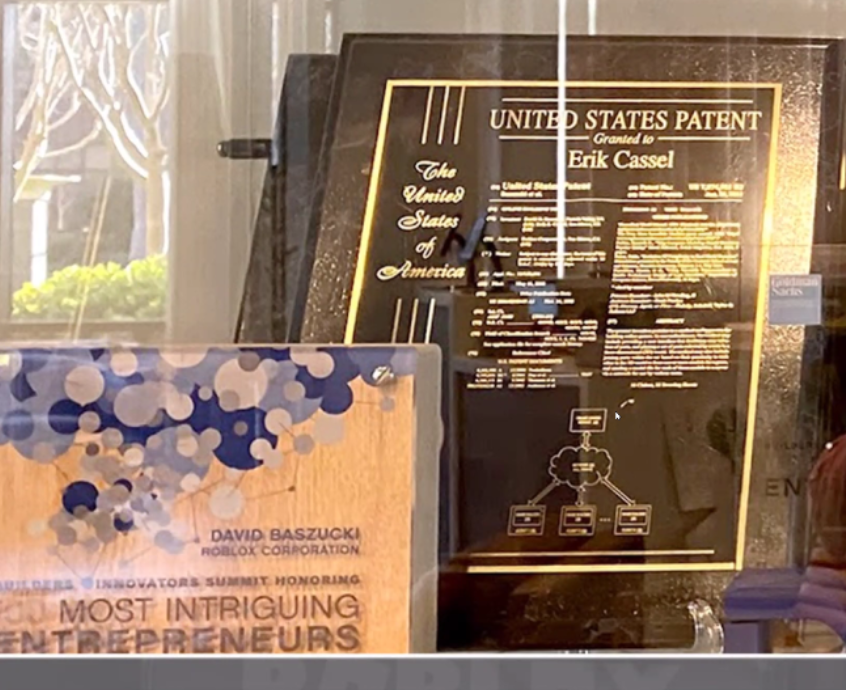
A "Most Intriguing Entrepreneurs" award granted to David Baszucki alongside a United States patent under the name of Erik Cassel.

On February 12, 2013, Roblox co-founder David Baszucki published a tribute to Cassel on the Roblox Blog. Baszucki wrote that Cassel had been battling cancer for three years and reflected on their more than 20 years of working together, first at Knowledge Revolution and later at Roblox. He credited Cassel with major contributions to the development of Roblox, including his advocacy for an API and scripting engine and his work on the original product. Baszucki also described Cassel as a highly talented engineer who was known for being warm, kind, and welcoming, and said that Cassel had worked to pass his knowledge and insights to other members of the Roblox engineering team after learning of his cancer. When Cassel learned of his cancer diagnosis, Baszucki said that he "worked selflessly to make sure his knowledge and insights were transferred" to members of Roblox.

The post also included tributes from several of Cassel's colleagues. Keith Lucas, who had worked with Cassel at Knowledge Revolution since 1997, credited him with teaching him how to approach engineering through iteration and experimentation and highlighted his role in building much of Roblox's original web infrastructure. Matt Dusek remembered Cassel for his intellect, generosity, engineering ability, humor, work ethic, and ability to inspire those around him. Tim Loduha recalled his kindness, humility, and willingness to help and teach others, while John Shedletsky described him as generous with his time and knowledge and praised his technical ability and character.

A Memorial Place was also created by Cassel's sons in his memory. Roblox promoted the memorial as a way for the community to honor Cassel, his family, and his contributions to the platform.

=== Cornell award ===
Cornell University established the Erik Cassel '90 Prize in his memory. The award is given to an undergraduate physics major who demonstrates exceptional creativity and promise in applying computer programming to a project in physics or a related field. Cornell states that Cassel's family provided funding for the award.

=== Roblox toy ===
In 2017, Roblox released a collectible figure based on Cassel's Roblox avatar as part of its first series of Roblox toys; the figure included a code for the virtual accessory "Erik's Code Review Specs".

=== Foundation ===
The Erik S. Cassel Foundation was established in his memory. The foundation's officers and directors have included members of Cassel's family.
