= Roblox =

Multiplayer game creation platform

- Logo used since 2022
- Developer: Roblox Corporation
- Publisher: Roblox Corporation
- Designers: David Baszucki; Erik Cassel
- Platforms: Windows; macOS; iOS; Android; Xbox One; Meta Quest 2; Meta Quest Pro; PlayStation 4; PlayStation 5
- Release: September 1, 2006: Windows; September 1, 2006; iOS; December 11, 2012; Android; July 16, 2014; Xbox One; November 20, 2015; Meta Quest 2, Quest Pro; September 2023; PS4; October 10, 2023; PS5; April 14, 2026
- Genres: Game creation system, massively multiplayer online game
- Modes: Single-player, multiplayer

Roblox (/ˈroʊ.blɒks/, ROH-bloks) is an online game platform and game creation system developed by Roblox Corporation that allows users to program and play games created by themselves or other users. It was developed by David Baszucki and Erik Cassel in 2004, and released to the public in 2006. As of February 2025, the platform has reported an average of 85.3 million daily active users. According to the company, its monthly player base includes half of all American children under the age of 16.

The platform hosts millions of user-created games, created using Luau, a modified dialect of the programming language Lua and the platform's game engine, Roblox Studio. While Roblox is free-to-play, it features in-game purchases done through its virtual currency known as Robux, and game developers on the platform are able to create items that cost Robux. The platform hosts a large virtual economy centered around those items and Robux. Using the platform's Developer Exchange program, creators are able to exchange their earned Robux for real-world currency. The platform has been used to host virtual concerts and events, as well as advergames.

While Roblox started off small—both in playerbase and as a company—it began to grow rapidly in the second half of the 2010s. This growth was further accelerated by the COVID-19 pandemic. By 2020, over 5,000 games on Roblox had been played over a million times, and over 20 had been played over one billion times. Although critic reviews for Roblox have been positive, it has faced criticism concerning child safety and its content moderation, due to material pornographic or politically extremist in nature. It has been criticized for its alleged exploitative practices toward children and microtransactions. The platform has been restricted or completely blocked in several countries, including China, Egypt, Turkey, and Iraq.

== Overview ==
The Roblox app icon since 2025

Roblox is an online game platform and game creation system built around user-generated content and games. Games can be created by any user through the platform's game engine, Roblox Studio, and then shared to and played by other players. The games featured on Roblox vary in genre, from role-playing video games to ones centered around escaping prison, among others. The platform is made to appeal to a family-friendly audience, and has been described as a massively multiplayer online game (MMO).

While Roblox is free-to-play, it features a virtual currency known as "Robux" that can be purchased with real-world money. Robux can be used to purchase virtual items that the player can use on their virtual character (or "avatar") on the platform, or access games that require payment. As with games, avatar items on Roblox are mainly user-generated, though most items on the platform were made by Roblox themselves for most of the platform's history. Through the platform's Developer Exchange program, creators on the platform are able to exchange their earned Robux to real-world money. Roblox features a monthly service called Roblox Plus, with its subscribers gaining access to more features.

=== Virtual economy ===
Logo of the virtual currency "Robux"

Roblox features a large virtual economy centered around its virtual currency Robux. The currency allows users to buy, sell and create virtual items. Roblox has a service called Roblox Plus, a subscription that gives users discounts on Robux and in-game purchases, and allows members to upload user-created content on the market.

Many items on Roblox are user-generated. While only Roblox developers were able to create avatar items early on, the capabilities of user-generated content has expanded greatly over time. Since 2019, select users have gained the ability to publish avatar accessories, animations, bundles and more. Some items on Roblox have a "limited" status, with only a few being available and the price of the item based on supply and demand rather than a fixed price. These items function similarly to non-fungible tokens. The prices of limited items range, with the most valuable ones costing millions of Robux. After the original supply of that item runs out, players can resell them for a higher price. Additionally, users with an active Roblox Plus subscription are able to trade limiteds amongst each other. Limited items made by the community cannot be traded and this feature is restricted to official items.

Developers are able to create purchasable content through one-time purchases. Through the Roblox Developer Exchange program, users are able to exchange their earned Robux for real-world money, as long as they have at least 30,000 Robux. In 2020, Roblox reported that roughly 345,000 game developers on the platform earned money through the program. Avatar item creators have also been able to generate profit with the platform, with some individuals designing items as a full-time job. It has been reported that the highest-earning creators have earned over $100,000 a year from item sales.

A sizeable amount of scams are on Roblox, largely revolving around messages promoting websites and games that are designed to appear to give out free Robux. There are people in the community known as "beamers" who compromise Roblox accounts to steal and sell their items on the platform's black markets. They employ various techniques, such as creating phishing websites or create ploys in order to acquire a victim's session token. Once they gain access to the victim's account, these "beamers" steal and subsequently sell valuable limited items owned by the victims for real-world currency or cryptocurrency through marketplace sites or Discord chat rooms. The slang term "beaming" is commonly used to describe this entire process on Roblox. Roblox does offer hacking victims a "rollback" for their items, although this is only offered once per account.

=== Roblox Studio and game design ===
The Roblox Studio interface as of August 2024

Roblox Studio is the platform's game engine and game development software. The engine and all games made on Roblox predominantly uses Luau, a dialect of the Lua 5.1 programming language. Since November 2021, the programming language has been open sourced under the MIT License. Some aspects of the engine were created using C++. To assist in the creation of games, Roblox Studio features multiple pre-made templates that users can modify.

As of 2020, Roblox reported that more than 2 million developers used Roblox Studio to create more than 20 million games per year. They also reported that a majority of developers were minors.

=== Games ===
Due to its status as a user-created games platform, Roblox has a variety of games; by July 2020, at least 20 games had been played more than one billion times, and at least 5,000 have been played more than one million times. Games on Roblox greatly range in genre, and the content of these games effects its age rating. These ratings are broken into different age groups: everyone, and players over the age of 9, 13, or 17. Games that are restricted to players over the age of 17 require ID verification to access.

TechCrunch noted in March 2021 that Roblox games are largely distinct from established traditions in free-to-play video games, finding that successful Roblox games were geared towards immediate satisfaction, and finding that the addition of tutorials significantly decreased player engagement, contrary to established wisdom about free-to-play games. Many companies have used Roblox to host advergames promoting their products.

=== Communication and age estimations ===
Roblox allows players to communicate with each other in a variety of ways, such as through in-game chat and direct messaging. Voice chat is usable for players over the age of 13 that have their age verified. Players can join communities, where users can send messages in an internet forum-like environment. Players are able to add other users as friends. An additional tier of this system, known as "Trusted Friends", allows users to send unfiltered chat messages and personal information to each other. If one of the users is over the age of 18 while the other user is between 13 and 17, then both parties must prove that they know each other in real life. This is done through either mutual QR code scanning, or importing their phone contacts.

Users can only communicate with each other after they perform an age check, which is done through either ID verification or having a video of themselves analyzed by age estimation software. Communication is further restricted to only allow users in similar age groups to communicate with each other. For example, a user who is twelve years old can only communicate with users aged 9 to 15. Age verification and estimations are handled via Persona, a third-party provider of age verification software. While the age estimation features can result in inaccurate age group assignment, the user can provide their ID to correct their age manually.

== History and development ==
=== 2004–2009: Creation and early history ===
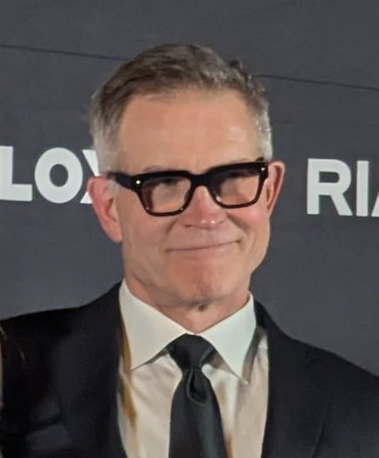
Roblox co-founder and current CEO David Baszucki in 2025

Roblox was created in 2004 by co-founders and software engineers David Baszucki and Erik Cassel. Before its creation, Baszucki and Cassel worked for Knowledge Revolution, a company that specialized in creating educational and physics simulation software. After Knowledge Revolution was acquired by MSC Software, the two left the company and Baszucki began investing in earlier social media sites like Friendster. Around this time, Baszucki came up with the idea of a physics sandbox with creation tools and a social networking aspect. Baszucki and Cassel began development on Roblox shortly afterwards, modeled after Baszucki's vision, and also created the Roblox Corporation. Early in its development, Roblox was known as DynaBlocks. It was determined early on in development that the two would design Roblox to rely entirely on user-generated content, only providing the tools necessary for people to develop games, as well as the server hosting later in development.

Baszucki and Cassel worked alone while making the earlier versions of Roblox, and created their own games on the platform before the creation tools were completed. These early versions of Roblox were extremely basic, with player avatars having not been animated yet and various features only being present in their most simplified form. They advertised Roblox on some websites, leading to a few dozen players joining the platform as playtesters. In mid-2006, the first two employees were hired to work on the platform's other features. These employees were Matt Dusek and John Shedletsky, with Dusek being responsible for working on the platform's communication aspects.

Roblox was released on September 1, 2006, with Roblox Studio being made available that same year. Games that were made by the community early in the platform's history included paintball games, haunted houses and model trains that players could ride. In 2008, the Roblox Corporation stopped actively creating its own games to demonstrate the platform's capabilities, becoming entirely reliant on user-created games. During this time in 2007, Roblox introduced the "Builders Club" membership subscription, which allowed for users to create more games under their account, sell virtual clothing, remove outside advertisements from the site and gain Robux daily. They subsequently added two tiers: Turbo Builders Club and Outrageous Builders Club. Early in the platform's history, it had two separate currencies: Robux and Tickets, with the latter often being referred to as "Tix".

=== 2010–2015: Early growth ===
2004

2004–2005

2005–2006

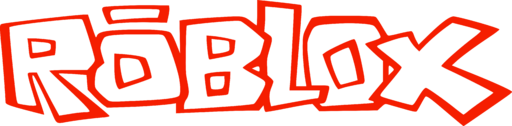
2006–2010

2010–2015

2015–2017

2017–2018

2018–2022

2022–present

Evolution of the Roblox logo

Roblox's growth continued throughout 2010 and the following years. By August 2011, Roblox had about 6.8 million active users monthly, becoming the second-most popular kids entertainment site. Its profits continued to increase, with the platform's profit that year up 75% from 2010; in June 2011, the company held a fundraiser that raised over $4 million. By January 2014, the platform's monthly player count had increased 10 to 12 million monthly players, although a majority of those players did not have registered accounts and instead played as guests.

By this point in the platform's history, several games had been played millions of times. One of the most successful creators on the platform at the time was Luke Weber, known on Roblox as "Stickmasterluke", who had a following of over ten million plays across all of his games combined. In August 2011, the first in-person convention centered around Roblox, known as the Roblox Rally, was held in San Francisco. It was attended by over 1,000 people. In 2013, the platform's co-founder Cassel died from cancer.

Throughout 2012, versions of Roblox for mobile devices were developed. By May, they had already released a stripped-down version of the platform for iOS that only included its social features, but did not allow users to play games on it. A version of the game for macOS was also released by that point. On December 11 of that year, a full version of Roblox for iOS was released that allowed users to play games, although users were not able to use Roblox Studio. After completing development on the iOS version, Roblox began looking into releasing a version for Android devices, as well as video game consoles. The version for Android was released on July 16, 2014. A version of Roblox for Xbox One was announced in September 2015 and released on November 20. This version initially only released with selection of 15 games chosen by Roblox staff, due to concerns regarding Entertainment Software Rating Board standards. A system that allowed users to publish their games on the platform was later released, based on an approval process.

From 2013 to 2014, Roblox released several updates to its development tools, adding features. Among these features was the Developer Exchange program, which initially only allowed payouts of up to $500. Other updates released around this time included adding support for character animations, Roblox Studio plugins, and Developer Stats, a feature that shows developers various statistics about their games, such as how many players were playing their game and for how long. In May 2015, Roblox released an update that adjusted its physics engine to be more smooth and realistic, rather than being oriented around blocks. This came with a feature called Smooth Terrain, which increased the graphic fidelity of in-game terrain.

=== 2016–2020: Accelerated growth and COVID-19 ===
In the latter half of the 2010s, Roblox began to rapidly grow in popularity. By December 2016, the platform had about 30 million monthly active users, a number that had increased to 90 million by April 2019. The platform's growth was further accelerated by the COVID-19 pandemic beginning in 2020, where lockdowns led tens of millions of people to use Roblox as a means of communication. Between March and April, Roblox reported having over 120 million monthly active players, which by that point the company said included over half of all kids in the United States that were under the age of 16. Additionally, the average number of daily active players in 2020 had increased by 85% compared to 2019. By this point, over 20 games had been played more than one billion times, and at least 5,000 had been played more than one million times. The most popular game on the platform around this time was the role-playing game Adopt Me!, which had been played over 10 billion times by July 2020 and had set a platform record of over 1.6 million users on at once.

In light of the platform's newfound popularity and use during lockdowns, Roblox introduced a new "Party Place" system, which were specific spaces that players could use to arrange meetups and events, such as virtual concerts. Around this time, Roblox began further working towards a vision that Baszucki described as a 30-year long plan where in which users have a "fully-fledged digital identity" in an environment such as Roblox. In July 2020, Baszucki formally announced plans and goals for Roblox developers and users to build a "metaverse", a concept that refers to several interconnected virtual worlds. As part of these plans, several other features were announced that would allow creators more freedom in their works, hoping to make them more "immersive" and making collaboration between developers easier. Features that were introduced around this time included Developer Events, a service that would allow creators to create and manage in-game events, and allow users to easily discover these events. He also announced a partnership between Roblox and record label Monstercat, giving users and creators the ability to use their catalog in games. In August 2019, Roblox began allowing select users to upload their own accessories, a service that was later expanded to include various other types of accessories.

Around this time, Roblox optimized the way that its different releases were developed over the course of 3 years, reaching a point where only a minimal amount of engineers were needed to maintain the platforms it was available on and all versions functioned off of the same APIs. In April 2016, Roblox became available for Oculus Rift, alongside a variety of quality-of-life features made specifically for that platform. The company also expressed interest in porting Roblox to other virtual reality devices in the future. In June of that year, the company also released a dedicated app for Windows 10. Efforts were also made towards making Roblox more accessible, with automatic machine translation being added to in-game chat in 2020, initially supporting 9 languages. In 2019, the Roblox Corporation signed a partnership deal with Tencent to bring Roblox to China, and was given permission to release in the region on December 3, 2020.

During this time period, several features from the platform were removed. In April 2016, Roblox discontinued its secondary currency, "Tickets", making Robux the platform's only currency. It was removed due to the company believing newer players would get confused by the presence of two separate currencies. In October 2017, Roblox removed the ability for people to play as a "guest", which allowed users to play games on the platform without having to use an account. That same year, Roblox discontinued its official player forums for an undisclosed reason. Additionally, in 2019, Roblox released Roblox Premium, which replaced its previous Builders Club memberships.

=== 2021–2025: Public listing and platform ===
The growth of Roblox, both as a platform and as a company, continued into 2021 and the following years. In March 2021, the Roblox Corporation went public, and became valued at $45 billion. Throughout 2021, Roblox averaged 45.5 million daily active users, a 40% increase from the end of 2020. In 2023, Roblox released public beta versions of the platform for Quest 2 and Meta Quest Pro on July 27, with full versions released in September. At the same time, a port of Roblox to the PlayStation 4 were announced, and later released on October 10. It is playable on the PlayStation 5 via backward compatibility. In 2021, Roblox made it to where games on the platform are referred to as "experiences" following the platform's involvement in the Epic Games v. Apple lawsuit. In June of that year, Roblox was sued by the National Music Publishers' Association (NMPA), alleging that the platform allowed users to upload copyrighted music without obtaining proper licensing, and made children believe that pirating music was acceptable. The lawsuit was dropped by September, ending with the Roblox Corporation and the NMPA forming a collaboration to establish a framework for future publisher partnerships.

After being given permission in late 2020, Roblox released in China in July 2021. This version of the platform, officially known as LuoBu, was published and operated by Tencent, and was heavily restricted due to China's regulations on video games. LuoBu failed to grow to substantially throughout its history, and was unable to generate much profit. In January 2022, LuoBu was shut down, with Roblox stating that they were going to redevelop the release, and that LuoBu was only ever intended to be a test version. In July of that year, documents of business slides from presentations as early as 2017 were leaked online by an unknown hacker. These documents revealed that the Roblox Corporation was planning to make several changes to the platform worldwide to comply with Chinese internet censorship laws, and that before canceling operations, they were concerned that Tencent would hack the platform and attempt to create a competitor.

Roblox's business model throughout this time has continued to be based around creating a metaverse, and attempting to increase the platform's appeal. In 2021, Baszucki further detailed the company's vision for Roblox to become a metaverse, highlighting "eight different characteristics" that the platform would strive to accommodate for. He also discussed the Ready Player One and Ready Player Two books as being inspirations for the company's ideas. Features that were added to Roblox during this time have included voice chat for users over the age of 13 that had their age verified through ID. Voice chat was then followed by facial animations based on the real-world motion tracking of the players face, which was announced in 2022 and released in 2023. In March 2024, two generative AI tools that were added to Roblox Studio in an effort to speed up content creation. These tools were for automatic avatar customization and texture generation, the former being able to automatically convert three-dimensional body meshes into live-animated avatars and the latter creating textures of objects based on a text-to-image model.

Also announced in 2022 were age ratings for games, a system created by the company to increase the platform's appeal to the young adult audience, which was the fastest growing demographic on Roblox, by allowing for more mature games. Initially, the highest rating that games could be given was 13+, although in June 2023, a 17+ rating was introduced that would permit games to feature more graphic violence, romantic themes and alcohol usage. Similarly, in November 2024, Roblox revamped its parental controls system, adding new safety measures for users under the age of 13, such as screen time and whether or not the child can exchange private messages with other users and allowing parents to create separate accounts to control their child's account.

=== 2026–present ===
Starting with certain countries as like Australia, New Zealand and the Netherlands in December 2025 and globally in January 2026, Roblox made age verification mandatory to communicate on the platform in any capacity. These changes came after Roblox was faced with multiple lawsuits and controversies regarding perceived child safety issues on the platform. A $12 million settlement served as a model for platform accountability, where funds were allocated for youth programs and law enforcement. Non-encrypted messaging for user safety was also part of the agreement terms.

In June 2026, the platform introduced more age-based restrictions by dividing user accounts into different tiers of Roblox: "Roblox Kids" (available to users under the age of 9), "Roblox Select" (for users 9 to 15), and standard Roblox (for users 16 and over). If a user does not verify their age, they are restricted to only playing games with an age rating of 9+ or lower. Age estimation or verification also became mandatory to publish a game. A port of Roblox for the PlayStation 5 was released on April 14, 2026. Roblox Premium was replaced by Roblox Plus in May 2026.

== Community and culture ==
As of February 2025, Roblox has reported over 85.3 million daily active users. According to the company, the monthly player base includes half of all American children under the age of 16. In addition to traditional games, the platform also hosts social hangout places; players have used the platform to express political activism, with some users declaring their support for the George Floyd protests and Black Lives Matter, and some using the platform to perform activities that were paused by COVID-19 lockdowns like religious processions. Roblox's original sound effect for when a character died, often transcribed and titled as the "oof" sound effect, became a popular internet meme. The sound was originally produced for the video game Messiah (2000), and it was replaced in 2022 after Roblox and the sound's producer entered a copyright dispute. In July 2025, the sound effect was officially reinstated back to Roblox, having gained the rights to use the audio. A hyperpop-based music scene, known as "Robloxcore", became popular online after several artists uploaded their music to the game in late 2020.

=== Merchandise ===
In January 2017, toy fabricator Jazwares began producing licensed toy minifigures based on the Roblox platform. The sets included a code that was used to redeem virtual items, as well as blind boxes that contained random minifigures. In April 2021, Hasbro released Roblox-themed Nerf blasters and a Roblox-themed version of Monopoly.

=== Events ===
Roblox occasionally hosts real-life and virtual events. They have in the past hosted events such as BloxCon, which was a convention for ordinary players on the platform, as well as virtual Easter egg hunts, Halloween events, "Giftsplosions", and also hosted an annual event called the "Bloxy Awards", an awards ceremony that also functions as a fundraiser. The 2020 edition of the Bloxy Awards, held virtually on the platform, drew 600,000 viewers. In 2022, "Bloxy Awards" got rebranded into the "Roblox Innovation Awards". Roblox Corporation annually hosts the Roblox Developers Conference, a three-day, invite-only event in San Francisco where top content creators on the site learn of upcoming changes to the platform. The company has also hosted similar events in cities like London.

=== Licensed and affiliated events ===
Roblox occasionally engages in events to promote films, such as ones held to promote Wonder Woman 1984 and Aquaman. Roblox has also hosted virtual concerts, such as the one starring Lil Nas X; during that concert, Lil Nas X debuted his song "Holiday". Future virtual concerts starred artists like Swedish singer Zara Larsson and American band Twenty One Pilots. In October 2021, Roblox partnered with Chipotle Mexican Grill to give $1 million of burritos away to the first 30,000 people every day as a part of Chipotle's "Halloween Boorito" promotion.

== Reception ==
Critical reception of Roblox has been generally positive. Common Sense Media rated Roblox 4 out of 5 stars, praising the website's variety of games and ability to encourage creativity in children while finding that the decentralized nature of the platform meant game quality varied, and recommended disabling chat functions for young players to prevent possibly harmful interactions. Patricia E. Vance of the Family Online Safety Institute advised parents to monitor their child's interactions on the platform but praised the platform for "...allowing kids to play, explore, socialize, create and learn in a self-directed way", and granting special praise to Roblox Studio for its ability to encourage children to experience game development. Trusted Reviews, in its overview of the platform, also praised Roblox Studio, stating that "for anyone seeking to develop their computer science skills, or create projects that will instantly receive feedback from a huge audience, the appeal is obvious".

Roblox has been criticized several times due to the content that is present on the platform, specifically the presence of sexual or politically extremist-related material. Similarly, its chat and game filtration system has been negatively received. Examples of sexual or politically extreme content that has appeared on the platform throughout its history include places themed around virtual sex clubs and nightclubs, all of which are generally referred to as "condo" games, and content related to far-right ideologies such as neo-fascism and neo-Nazism, such as games that allow players to roleplay as Nazis or recreate real world massacres such as the Christchurch mosque shootings, the Columbine High School massacre and the Uvalde school shooting. To combat the presence of this content, Roblox has over 1,600 people working to remove such material from the platform, and also offers privacy settings and parental controls; a 2020 investigation by Fast Company found that sexual content was very prevalent on Roblox and likened attempts to remove the material to whack-a-mole. The platform has also seen numerous reports of sexual predation on child players, which a 2024 Bloomberg Businessweek report attributed to insufficient moderation, which has been viewed as overly reliant on artificial intelligence, and also due to how users on the platform are anonymous. Since January 2025, United States police have arrested at least six people alleged to have used Roblox to find and sexually exploit children, including "coercing minors into making pornography". In response to perceived moderation issues, there have been instances where players have formed "vigilante groups" to mass report predatory content and users on the platform. Roblox has spoken out against the existence of these groups, claiming they cause more harm than good, such as by luring in predators by impersonating children. In August 2025, Roblox sent a cease and desist to a YouTuber alleging that he had been involved with vigilantism, leading to widespread criticism towards the company.

Roblox's business model has also been criticized, with the platform being accused of featuring exploitative practices that target children; Professor Jane Juffer at Cornell University accused Roblox of encouraging consumerism in children. Some found that the platform made it very easy to purchase microtransactions, leading to numerous instances where children have spent large sums of money on the platform without parents' knowledge. In April 2022, Truth in Advertising filed a complaint against Roblox with the Federal Trade Commission for false advertising, mainly failing to disclose when advertising is present, such as with advergames and brand ambassadors. As a response, Roblox hid advertisements from users under the age of 13 starting in March 2023. However, these restrictions did not apply to advergames, leading to further criticism by Truth in Advertising and children's digital rights organization 5Rights. Investigative journalism YouTube channel People Make Games accused the platform of "exploiting" younger game developers by promising them large amounts of money from creating games, only to apply high revenue cuts and leaving creators with little to no income. They likened the platform's business model to a company scrip. After Roblox requested the channel to take down the video, People Make Games released several more accusations towards Roblox, focused on an alleged lack of oversight of developers and a method for people to address developer abuse, leading to child developers being exploited for labor on third-party platforms. They also criticized the platform's virtual economy, comparing the limited collectibles market to gambling. It has also been accused by Hindenburg Research of artificially inflating its monthly active player count.

=== Restrictions by country ===
Roblox restrictions by country

Roblox is blocked or banned in Algeria, China, Egypt, Iran, Iraq, North Korea, Oman, Palestine, Qatar, and Turkey. It was also banned in the United Arab Emirates from 2018 to 2021. Kuwait briefly banned the game from August to October 2025, with the country lifting the ban after Roblox agreed to implement a set of new safety and content restrictions requested by Kuwaiti authorities. The reasons for these bans differ: Turkey cited content that could promote gambling and child sexual abuse, while Qatar referenced child safety concerns. Russia banned the platform for promoting "extremist materials" and content related to the LGBTQ community, although the ban was lifted on June 10, 2026. The Netherlands and Belgium have restricted certain games on the platform due to their regulations on in-game "lootboxes", which give out items based on random or unknown chances, to reduce children's exposure to gambling.

In February 2025, Bloomberg News reported that Roblox was under investigation by the U.S. Securities and Exchange Commission for unknown reasons. Later that year in August, Indonesia requested that Roblox strengthen its chat filters to remove harmful content and enhance child safety, warning that failure to comply could result in a ban. Members of Bahrain's parliament began drafting a bill to ban Roblox in the country following concerns about child safety in 2025. Age verification to communicate on the platform was made mandatory Australia, New Zealand, and the Netherlands in December 2025, and globally in January 2026. These changes came after Roblox was faced with multiple lawsuits and controversies regarding perceived child safety issues on the platform.

Multiple other countries or regions have issued warnings to its population regarding the platform. Guatemala issued a warning to parents in 2021. Authorities in the city of Surabaya imposed local bans on Roblox in primary and secondary schools in 2025, citing multiple incidents where sexual predators had harassed minors through the platform, following requests from the local Ministry of Education. That same year, the Committee for Children's Rights Protection of the Ministry of Education of Kazakhstan issued a warning towards parents for similar reasons. The General Directorate of Internal Affairs of the City of Bishkek in Kyrgyzstan later did the same. In September 2025, the government of the Mexican state of Nuevo León, through its civil police and cyber police unit, issued a public warning to parents stating that Roblox was not a safe platform for children for similar reasons.

The European Union categorized Roblox as a "Very Large Online Platform" under the context of the Digital Services Act, having a reach of more than 45 million users, in August 2026, which requires the platform by the end of 2026 to implement controls and assess risks to users related to illegal content, harm to minors, physical and mental health, and rights of citizens within the EU. An Australian investigative report aired in October 2026 revealed that children had been targeted by international groups on Roblox and encouraged to move to other platforms such as Discord, where they were groomed and encouraged to self-harm. The most notorious group is called 764.

=== Revenue ===
During the 2017 Roblox Developers Conference, officials said that creators on the game platform, of which there were about 1.7 million as of 2017, collectively earned at least $30 million in 2017. The iOS version of Roblox passed $1 billion of lifetime revenue in November 2019, $1.5 billion in June 2020, and $2 billion in October 2020, making it the iOS app with the second-highest revenue. Several individual games on Roblox have accumulated revenues of over $10 million, while developers as a whole on the platform were collectively projected to have earned around $250 million over the course of 2020. It became the third highest-grossing game of 2020, with a revenue of $2.29 billion, below the Tencent titles PUBG and Honor of Kings.
