= Roblox Corporation =

American video game company

Coordinates: 37°32′32″N 122°18′2″W

- Wordmark used since 2022

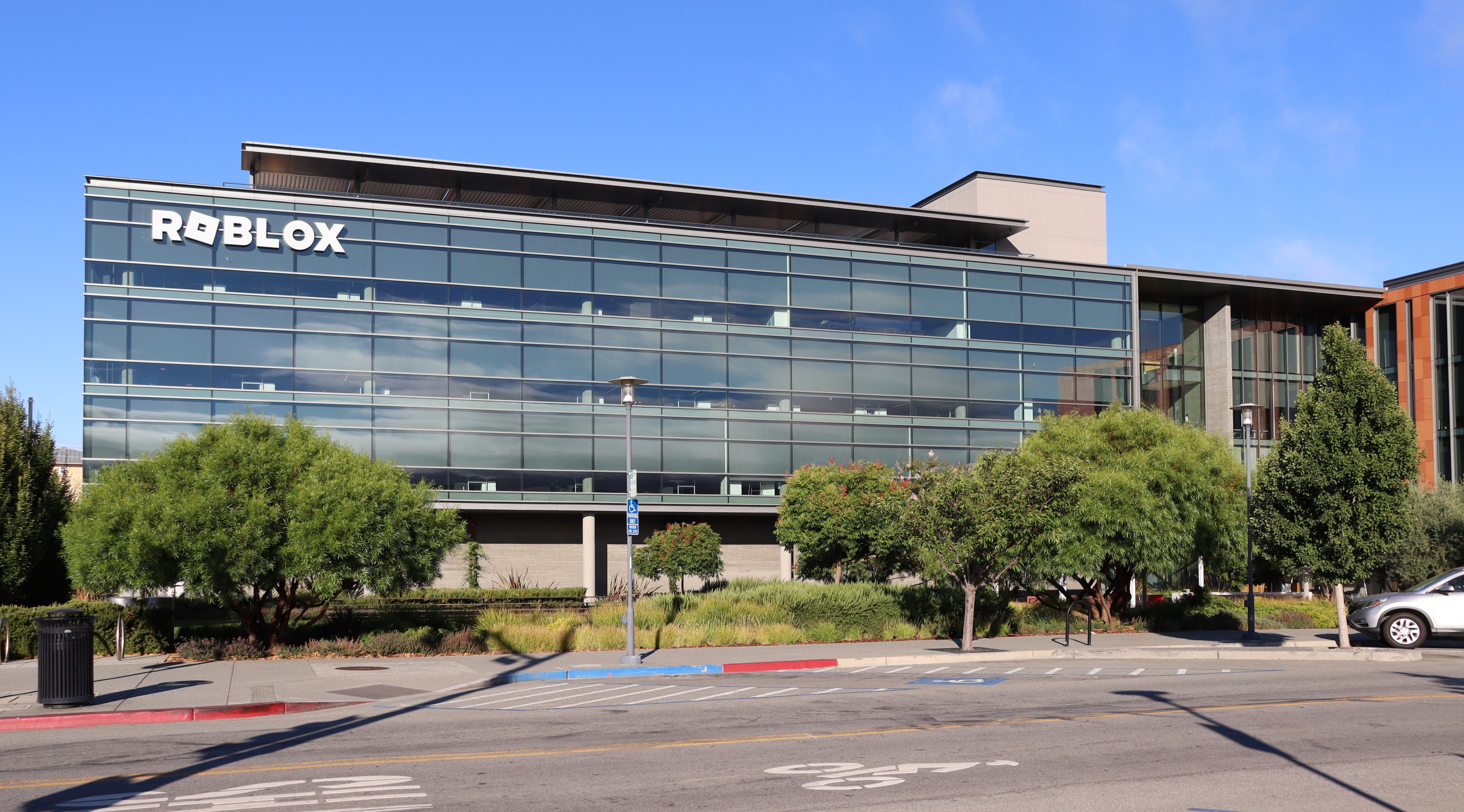
- Headquarters in San Mateo, July 2024
- Type: Public
- Traded as: NYSE: RBLX (Class A); Russell 1000 component
- ISIN: US7710491033
- Industry: Video games
- Founded: 2004; 22 years ago in Menlo Park, California, U.S.
- Founders: David Baszucki; Erik Cassel
- Headquarters: San Mateo, California, United States
- Key people: David Baszucki (CEO)
- Products: Roblox; Guilded; Luau
- Revenue: ▲US$3.60 billion (2024)
- Operating income: ▲US$−1.06 billion (2024)
- Net income: ▲US$−935 million (2024)
- Total assets: ▲US$7.18 billion (2024)
- Total equity: ▲US$221 million (2024)
- Number of employees: 2,474 (2024)
- Subsidiaries: Bash Video; Guilded; Guilded, Inc.; Loom.ai; PacketZoom; Hamul; TriplePlay; Byfron Technologies; Speechly; Imbellus, Inc.; Jido, Inc.
- Website: corp.roblox.com

The Roblox Corporation (/ˈroʊ.blɒks/, ROH-bloks) is an American video game developer based in San Mateo, California. Founded in 2004 by David Baszucki and Erik Cassel, the company is the developer of Roblox, a game platform, which was released in 2006. As of December 31, 2024, the company employs over 2,400 people.

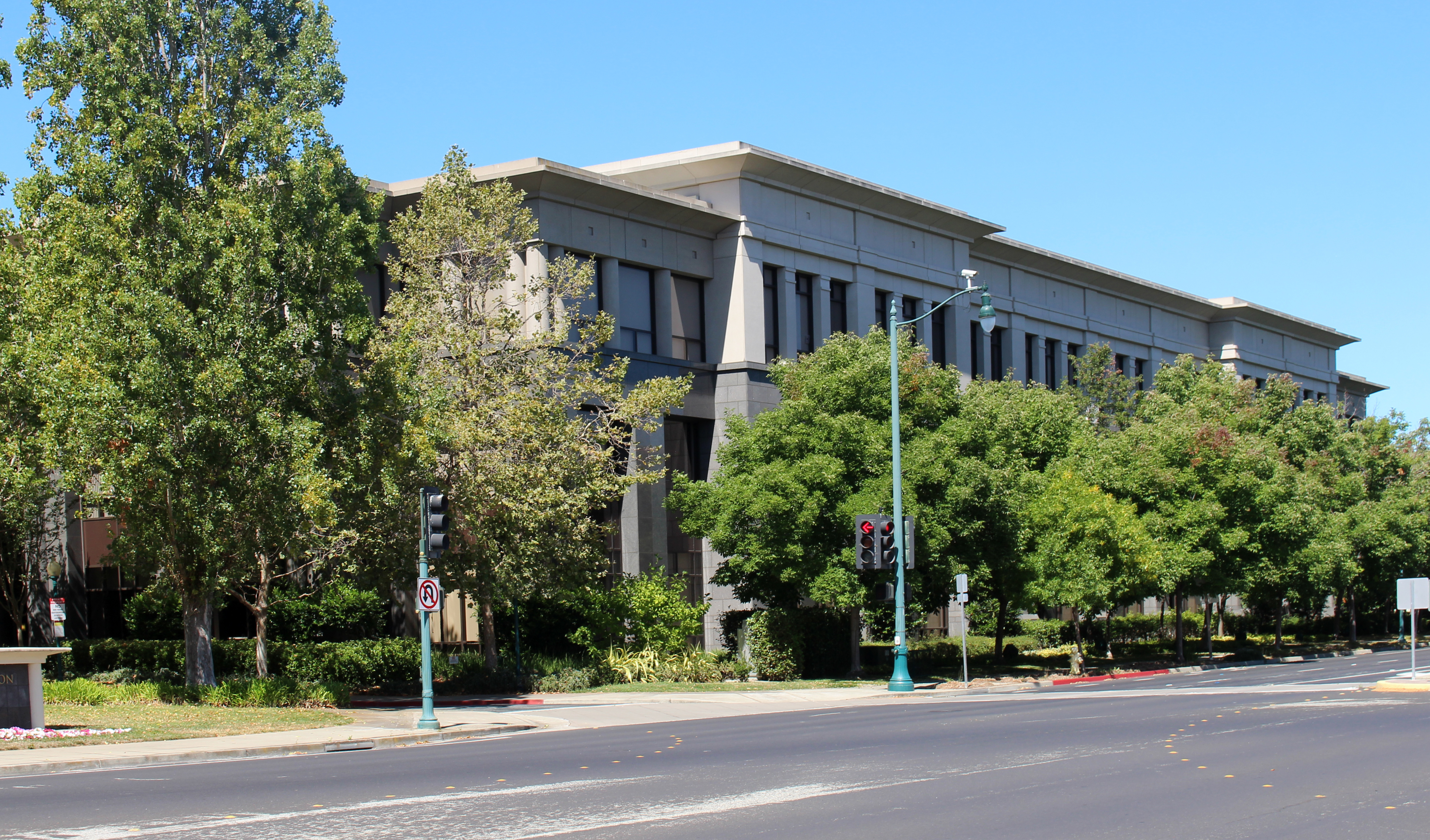
Former Roblox headquarters, now occupied by Guidewire Software

== History ==
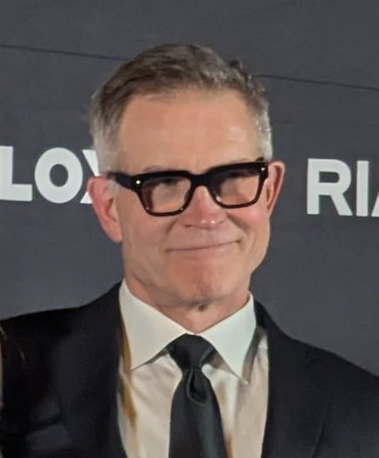
Roblox Corporation's co-founder and CEO, David Baszucki, in 2025

Roblox Corporation was founded by David Baszucki and Erik Cassel. Baszucki had previously founded Knowledge Revolution, an educational software company, in 1989. With him and Cassel, the company developed Interactive Physics, a 2D physics simulation released in the same year. Knowledge Revolution followed this up with Working Model, a software that simulated mechanical devices. The company was eventually purchased in December 1998 for US$20 million by MSC Software, where Baszucki and Cassel obtained senior positions. Baszucki was the company's vice president and general manager from 2000 until 2002, when he left MSC Software to establish Baszucki & Associates, an angel investment firm. He and Cassel founded Roblox Corporation in 2004. Working from an office in Menlo Park, California, they began preliminary work on the video game DynaBlocks, which was launched in a beta state later that year. The game's name was changed to Roblox in 2005, and the game was formally released on September 1, 2006.

Cassel died from cancer on February 11, 2013. In December 2013, Roblox Corporation had 68 employees, which it raised to 163 by December 2016. The company secured an $82 million investment in March 2017 through a round of funding led by Meritech Capital Partners and Index Ventures. Eyeing international expansion, Roblox Corporation established Roblox International and hired Chris Misner as its president in May 2018. Under Misner, Roblox was launched in Chinese (in partnership with Tencent), German, and French in 2019. By September 2018, Roblox Corporation had hired Dan Williams (previously of Dropbox) to move Roblox from a third-party cloud computing service to a proprietary one. In October 2018, the company acquired PacketZoom, a developer of mobile network optimization software. PacketZoom, including its employees, founder, and chief technology officer Chetan Ahuja, was merged into Roblox Corporation.

A "series G" funding round in February 2020, led by Andreessen Horowitz, raised $150 million for Roblox Corporation and valued the company at $4 billion. By October 2020, Roblox Corporation had begun planning to become a public company, evaluating whether to perform a regular initial public offering (IPO) or use the less common method of a direct listing. Later that month, the company filed with the United States Securities and Exchange Commission (SEC) to prepare an IPO worth $1 billion, looking to be listed on the New York Stock Exchange (NYSE) with the ticker symbol "RBLX". By this time, the company had more than 830 full-time employees and 1,700 "trust and safety agents". The company acquired Loom.ai, a company that creates 3D avatars from photographs, in December 2020. In January 2021, Roblox Corporation announced that it would pursue a direct listing instead of an IPO. The SEC had also requested that Roblox Corporation change how it reports the sales of its virtual currency, Robux. In the same month, Altimeter Capital and Dragoneer Investment Group led a "series H" round of funding that valued the company at $29.5 billion. The NYSE approved the direct listing of Roblox Corporation's class A shares by February 2021. The shares began trading on March 10 that year, with the initial buys giving the company an estimated $41.9 billion valuation. In August 2021, Roblox Corporation acquired the online communication platforms Bash Video and Guilded, paying $90 million in cash and stock for the latter.

In March 2023, Roblox and Guidewire Software agreed to switch office buildings under sublease agreements, with Roblox moving to the former Guidewire building at Bay Meadows, with 180,000 ft^{2} (17,000 m^{2}) of office space, and Guidewire moving to the former 80,000 ft^{2} (7,400 m^{2}) Roblox building near the Franklin Templeton campus. In July 2023, Roblox Corporation rolled out a "Roblox Partner Program" with seven initial developers partnered to create playable Roblox experiences for brands interested in advertising through Roblox's platform as a medium. In August 2023, Roblox unveiled plans to create an in-game career center, where players can turn up for events, podcasts, and conversations with actual employees. A month later, Roblox laid off 30 employees in its talent acquisition, citing a slowdown in hiring.

== Reception ==
=== Accolades ===
Roblox Corporation has been ranked on Pocket Gamer.biz's top lists of mobile game developers, placing sixth in 2018, eighth in 2019, and sixth in 2020. Fortune featured it as one of the best small and medium-sized workplaces in the San Francisco Bay Area, placing it sixteenth in 2019 and fortieth in 2021. In 2016 and 2017, Inc. ranked Roblox Corporation on its "Inc. 5000" list of fastest-growing private companies in the United States. In 2020, Fast Company regarded it as the ninth-most innovative company in the world, as well as the most innovative in the gaming sector.

=== Criticism ===
People Make Games on YouTube
- Investigation: How Roblox Is Exploiting Young Game Developers
- Roblox Pressured Us to Delete Our Video. So We Dug Deeper.

On August 19, 2021, the YouTube channel People Make Games released the results of their investigation into the Roblox Corporation. In their video report, they allege the company exploits young video game developers by taking an outsized share (75.5%) of the revenue made from games on their platform.

In a discussion with Axios, Roblox chief product officer (CPO) Manuel Bronstein responded by saying that Roblox intends to give more money to its community developers. After the report's publication, Roblox asked People Make Games to retract the video. Instead, they released a follow-up video report which further outlined several child safety issues they felt were present in Roblox.

== Legal disputes ==
In June 2016, Cinemark Theatres filed a lawsuit against Roblox Corporation over trademark infringement. The plaintiff cited several user-created games within Roblox that recreated Cinemark locations, including the trademarked branding. In February 2018, YouTuber Kerstin Hoffmann, known as Keisyo, claimed that Roblox Corporation owed her $150,000 because the company had stopped her from converting her 42 million Robux balance into real-world money for no given reason. In response, Roblox Corporation stated that she could not transfer her Robux because she had earned them through "fraudulent activities".

In May 2021, an unnamed litigant filed a class-action lawsuit against Roblox Corporation, accusing the company of ripping off players with bogus purchases. Stating "The company's decision to sell first and 'moderate' later has obvious monetary benefit for Roblox, by the time defendant has deleted items from the Avatar Shop and users' inventories, it has already taken its 30% commission from the sale." Roblox Corporation said that they review all content submitted by developers through a multi-step review process before it appears on the platform. In May 2023, Roblox agreed to settle the suit for $10 million, in the form of a Robux refund to any users who bought an item before May 11, 2023.

In June 2021, the National Music Publishers' Association filed a lawsuit against Roblox Corporation for $200 million, accusing the company of infringing copyright laws. The complaint states, "Roblox actively preys on its impressionable user base and their desire for popular music, teaching children that pirating music is perfectly acceptable." Roblox Corporation responded to the lawsuit by contending that they "do not tolerate copyright infringement" and expressing an intent to contest the lawsuit. On September 27, 2021, Roblox and NMPA announced they had reached an agreement that "settles claims filed by NMPA members [and] offers an industry-wide opt-in open to all eligible NMPA publishers," settling the lawsuit.

In November 2021, Roblox Corporation filed a $1.65 million lawsuit against YouTuber Benjamin Robert Simon, also known online as Ruben Sim. The complaint states a breach of contract, "cyber-bullying and harassing Roblox employees and executives" and "posting false and misleading terrorist threats" during the Roblox Developer Conference 2021 which led to it being temporarily shut down. On January 16, 2022, the lawsuit was settled by both parties which required Simon to pay $150,000 to Roblox Corporation. With the lawsuit settled, Simon is permanently banned from accessing Roblox. Due to it being resolved out of court, a legal precedent for other users who may evade IP bans or violate a game's terms of service was not established.

In October 2022, a lawsuit was filed by a parent in the San Francisco Superior Court. The lawsuit alleges that Roblox connected their daughter with online predators, who sexually exploited her, coercing her to send sexually explicit photos to them on Discord and Snapchat, who were also named in the lawsuit. In August 2023, a class-action lawsuit was brought against Roblox Corporation. The lawsuit alleges that Roblox profited off minors when they bought Robux to participate in third-party gambling rings, violating the RICO act.

=== Schlep controversy and lawsuit ===
In August 2025, Roblox Corporation issued a cease-and-desist letter to YouTuber Schlep, prominent for conducting sting operations against alleged online predators via the platform. Roblox Corporation's letter stated that the activities of Schlep and other vigilante streamers were a violation of the platform's terms of service, and created an unsafe environment for users. Concurrent with the legal notice, Roblox terminated all accounts associated with Schlep and his group, and IP-banned him from the platform. This has also prompted multiple Roblox-affiliated content creators of the Roblox Video Stars Program to leave as protest. Following the controversy, Roblox Corporation's stock price fell by over 11%, reflecting investor concerns. Schlep later announced that he is planning to countersue Roblox.

The company's actions were met with major backlash from many online communities who viewed Schlep's actions as necessary for community policing. The situation escalated significantly days later and included calls for the CEO to resign and a petition by U.S. representative Ro Khanna. Shortly after, Indonesia said that it began considering blocking Roblox in their country, and Qatar fully blocked Roblox. On August 14, Louisiana Attorney General Liz Murrill filed a child protection lawsuit against Roblox Corporation. The suit alleged that by actively shutting down independent efforts to expose potential dangers on its platform, Roblox was failing in its duty to protect underage users from harm. Roblox responded to the lawsuit on August 15.

== Lobbying and political influence ==
In 2025, Roblox was among donors who funded the White House's East Wing demolition and planned building of a ballroom.
