= Paternalism =

Sociological behaviour

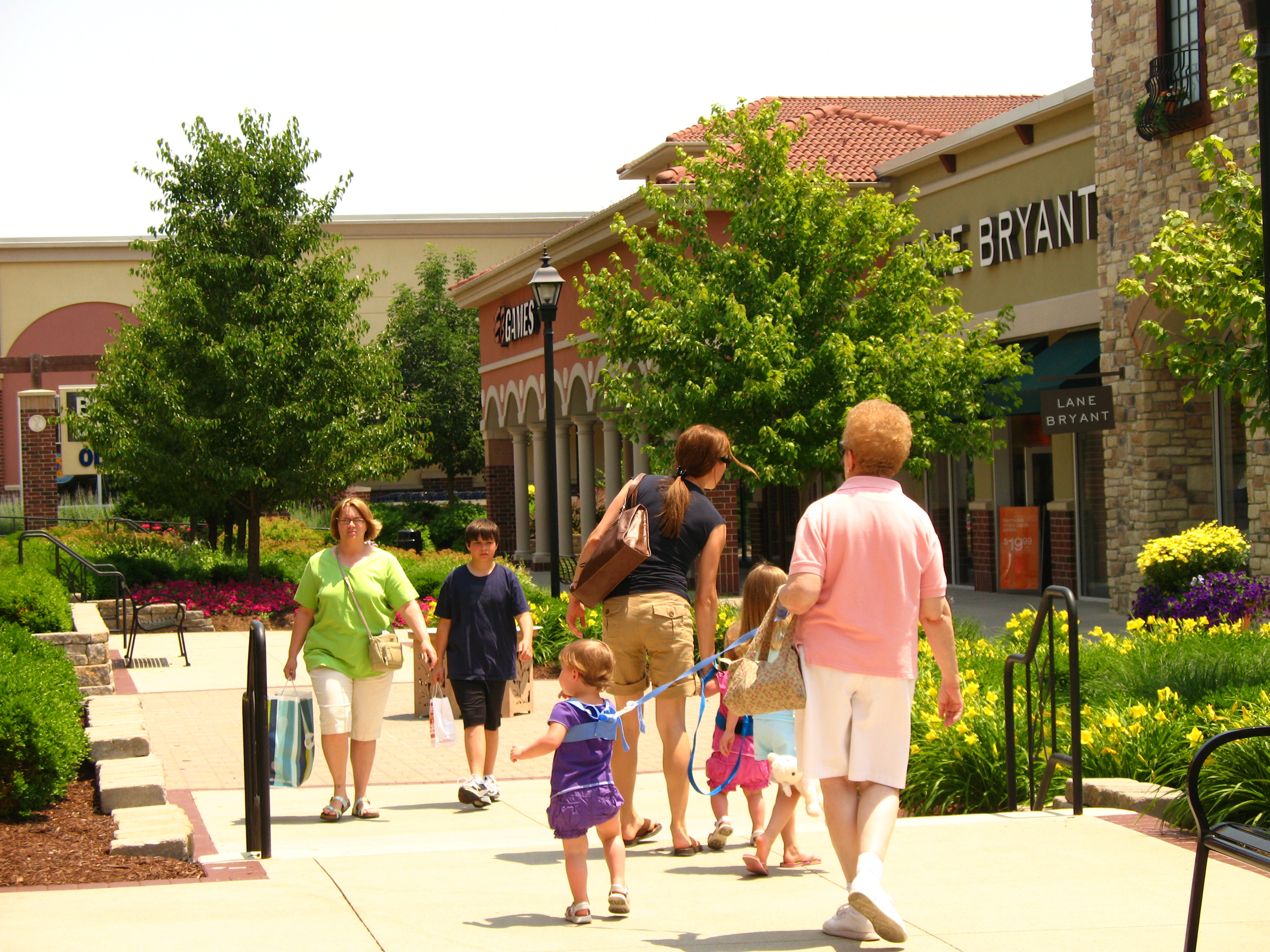
Child wearing a child harness

Paternalism is an action that interferes with a person's or group's liberty or autonomy against their will and is intended to promote their own good. It has been defended in a variety of contexts as a means of protecting individuals from significant harm, supporting long-term autonomy, or promoting moral or psychological well-being. Such justifications are commonly found in public health policy, legal theory, medical ethics, and behavioral economics, where limited intervention is viewed as compatible with or even supportive of personal agency.

Some, such as John Stuart Mill, think paternalism can be appropriate towards children, saying:

"It is, perhaps, hardly necessary to say that this doctrine [i.e. that individual liberty should only be restricted to protect a person or to protect others] is meant to apply only to human beings in the maturity of their faculties. We are not speaking of children, or of young persons below the age which the law may fix as that of manhood or womanhood."

Paternalism towards adults is sometimes characterized as treating them as if they were children.

Some critics argue that such interventions can infringe upon autonomy and reflect insufficient respect for an individual’s capacity for self-determination. The terms 'paternalism,' 'paternalistic,' and 'paternalist' are sometimes used pejoratively, particularly in political or social discourse.

== Etymology ==
The word paternalism derives from the adjective paternal, which entered the English language in the fifteenth century from Old French paternel (cf. Old Occitan paternal, as in Catalan, Spanish and Portuguese), itself from Medieval Latin paternalis. The classical Latin equivalent was paternus 'fatherly', from pater 'father'.

== Types ==
=== Soft and hard ===
Soft paternalism is the view that paternalism is justified only if an action to be committed is involuntary. John Stuart Mill gives the example of a person about to walk across a damaged bridge. Because the person does not know the bridge is damaged and there is no time to warn him, seizing him and turning him back is not an infringement on his liberty. According to soft paternalism, one would be justified in forcing him to not cross the bridge so one could find out whether he knows about the damage. If he knows and wants to jump off the bridge and commit suicide, then one should allow him to. Soft paternalism is the intervention due to a person not having the rationality or ability to make decisions. If a patient in an emergency room is intoxicated or unconscious, they do not possess the rationality or ability to make decisions for themselves and any decisions made on their behalf would be soft paternalism.

Hard paternalists say that at least sometimes one is entitled to prevent him from crossing the bridge and committing suicide. Hard paternalism does not rely on the absence of rationality or ability. In the emergency room example, the patient is sober or conscious and possesses the rationality and ability to make decisions about their care. Any decision that is made on their behalf would be hard paternalism.

There is also the question of if the length of incompetence plays a hand in the permissibility of paternalism. It seems obvious that if a person is permanently incompetent to make their own decisions paternalism is permissible, but if the incompetence is only temporary, the answer is not as clear.

=== Pure and impure forms ===
Pure paternalism is paternalism where the people having their liberty or autonomy taken away are those being protected. Impure paternalism occurs when the class of people whose liberty or autonomy is violated by some measure is wider than the group of persons thereby protected.

=== Moral and welfare ===
Moral paternalism is where paternalism is justified to promote the moral well-being of a person(s) even if their welfare would not improve. For example, it could be argued that someone should be prevented from prostitution even if they make a decent living off it and their health is protected. A moral paternalist would argue that it is ethical, considering they believe prostitution to be morally corrupting.

== Criteria for effective paternalism ==
Philosopher Thomas Pogge argues that there are a number of criteria for paternalism.

- The concept should work within human flourishing. Generally accepted items such as nutrition, clothing, shelter, certain basic freedoms may be acceptable by a range of religious and social backgrounds.
- The criteria should be minimally intrusive.
- The requirements of the criteria should not be understood as exhaustive, leaving societies the ability to modify the criteria based on their own needs.
- The supplementary considerations introduced by such more ambitious criteria of justice must not be allowed to outweigh the modest considerations.

== Opponents ==
In his Two Treatises of Government, John Locke argues (against Robert Filmer) that political and paternal power are not the same.

John Stuart Mill opposes state paternalism on the grounds that individuals know their own good better than the state does, that the moral equality of persons demands respect for others' liberty, and that paternalism disrupts the development of an independent character. In On Liberty, he writes:

[T]he only purpose for which power can be rightfully exercised over any member of a civilized community, against his will, is to prevent harm to others. His own good, either physical or moral, is not a sufficient warrant. He cannot rightfully be compelled to do or forbear because it will be better for him to do so, because it will make him happier, because, in the opinion of others, to do so would be wise, or even right.

Mill, however, disregards his own analysis when it comes to colonial subjects. In On Liberty, he writes:

Those who are still in a state to require being taken care of by others, must be protected against their own actions as well as against external injury. For the same reason, we may leave out of consideration those backward states of society in which the race itself may be considered as in its nonage. The early difficulties in the way of spontaneous progress are so great, that there is seldom any choice of means for overcoming them; and a ruler full of the spirit of improvement is warranted in the use of any expedients that will attain an end, perhaps otherwise unattainable. Despotism is a legitimate mode of government in dealing with barbarians, provided the end be their improvement, and the means justified by actually effecting that end.

Mill above declares barbarians to be in need of paternalism. But he narrowly defines barbarism historically, geographically, and economically insofar as to declare it fit to describe the people he intends to describe as such.

Contemporary opponents of paternalism often appeal to the ideal of personal autonomy.

== In society ==
- Mandatory seatbelt laws override individual choice to not wear a seatbelt in order to protect individuals from serious injury or death. Such laws are supported on the grounds that individuals often irrationally discount future harm, and state intervention can serve to preserve both welfare and long-term autonomy.
- In the Southern United States before the Civil War, paternalism was a concept used to justify the legitimacy of slavery. Women would present themselves as mothers for the slaves, or protectors that provided benefits the slaves would not get on their own. Plantation mistresses would attempt to civilize their workers by providing food, shelter, and affection. These women would justify that the conditions for freed blacks were poorer than those who were under the mistresses' protection. Paternalism was used as an argument against the emancipation of slavery due to these mistresses providing better living conditions than the enslaved's counterpart in the factory-based north. As a result of this conclusion, the whites would often manage basic rights of the enslaved, such as child-rearing and property.
- Medical paternalism is perhaps the most common type of paternalism in society. Parents make decisions for their children because they do not possess the rationality or ability to make their own medical decisions. If a person is unconscious, their power of attorney would make their medical decisions for them. Both are examples of soft paternalism, but an example of hard paternalism in medicine is therapeutic privilege, especially when the patient has been previously deemed competent.
- Anti-suicide interventions override an individual’s decision to end their life in order to prevent irreversible harm. These interventions are defended on the basis that individuals experiencing suicidal ideation may be acting under impaired judgment or temporary mental distress, and that intervention can preserve life and enable the restoration of rational autonomy.
- Bans on swimming at public beaches without lifeguards restrict individuals from engaging in risky behavior even when they are aware of the dangers and willing to accept them. Such policies are justified on the grounds of preventing serious harm.

== See also ==
- Adultism
- Authoritarianism
- Caciquism
- Libertarian paternalism
- Noble lie
- Nudge theory
- Obscurantism
- Paternalistic conservatism
- Perfectionist liberalism
- Rule according to higher law
