= Jeff Landry =

Governor of Louisiana since 2024

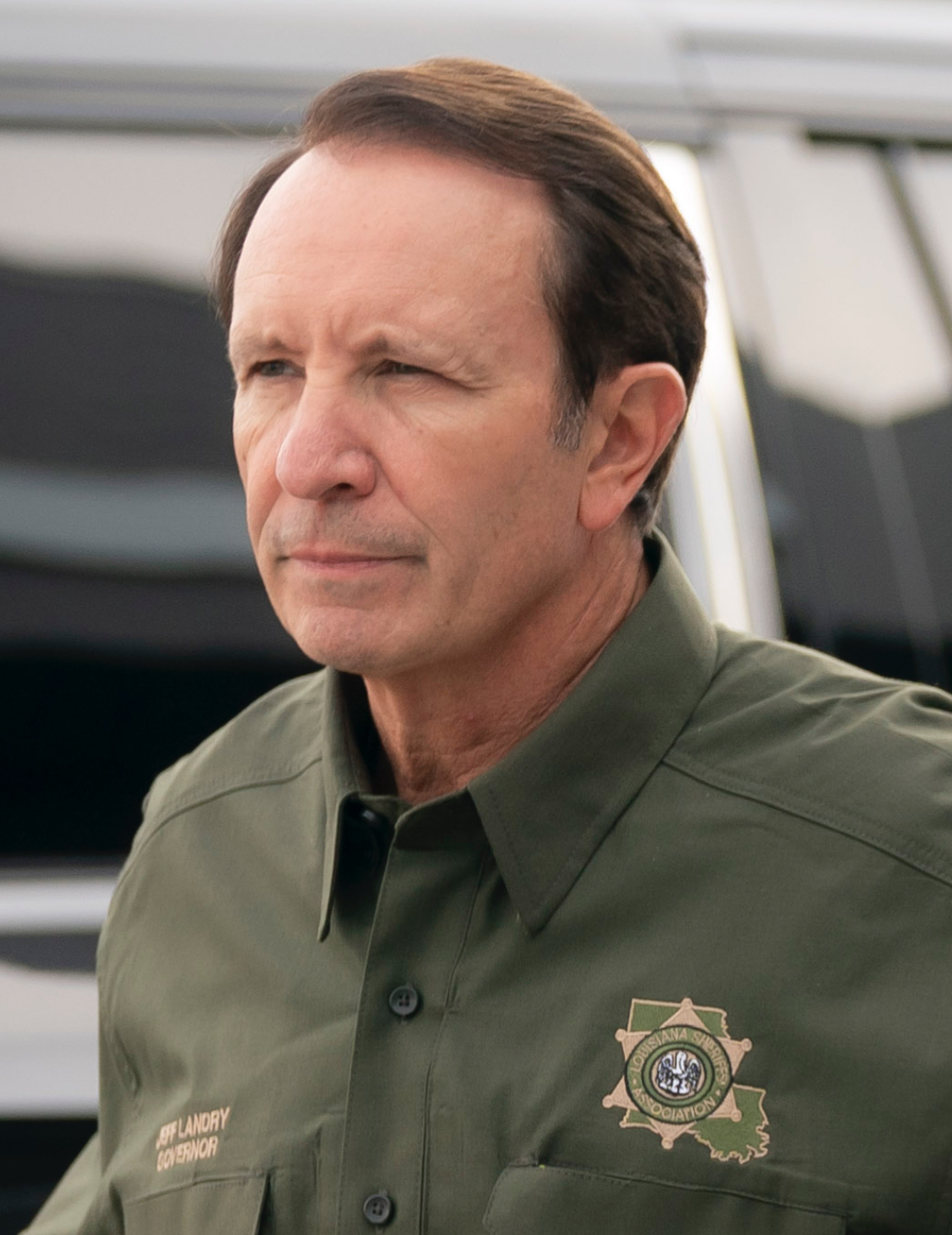
- Landry in 2025

57th Governor of Louisiana
- Incumbent
- Assumed office January 8, 2024
- Lieutenant: Billy Nungesser
- Preceded by: John Bel Edwards

United States Special Envoy to Greenland
- Incumbent
- Assumed office December 22, 2025
- President: Donald Trump
- Preceded by: Position established

45th Attorney General of Louisiana
- In office January 11, 2016 – January 8, 2024
- Governor: John Bel Edwards
- Preceded by: Buddy Caldwell
- Succeeded by: Liz Murrill

Member of the U.S. House of Representatives from Louisiana's 3rd district
- In office January 3, 2011 – January 3, 2013
- Preceded by: Charlie Melançon
- Succeeded by: Charles Boustany (redistricted)

Personal details
- Born: Jeffrey Martin Landry; December 23, 1970 (age 55) St. Martinville, Louisiana, U.S.
- Party: Republican
- Spouse: Sharon LeBlanc
- Children: 1
- Education: University of Louisiana, Lafayette (BS); Loyola University New Orleans (JD)
- Website: Campaign website

Military service
- Branch/service: United States Army
- Years of service: 1987–1998
- Rank: Sergeant
- Unit: Louisiana National Guard
- Awards: Army Achievement Medal; Army Commendation Medal; Louisiana War Cross
- Landry's voice Landry on the energy policy of the Barack Obama administration Recorded July 25, 2012

Jeffrey Martin Landry (Note: /ˈlændri/ LAN-dree) (born December 23, 1970) is an American politician and attorney serving as the 57th governor of Louisiana since 2024 and as the United States special envoy for Greenland since 2025. A member of the Republican Party, he served from 2016 to 2024 as the 45th attorney general of Louisiana and from 2011 to 2013 as the U.S. representative for Louisiana's 3rd congressional district.

Born in St. Martinville, Louisiana, Landry graduated from the University of Louisiana, Lafayette and Loyola University New Orleans College of Law. He was a member of the Louisiana National Guard, which he joined while in high school, for 11 years. While in college, Landry worked as a police officer and sheriff's deputy. He ran for a seat in the Louisiana State Senate in 2007 but narrowly lost. He was elected to the U.S. House of Representatives in 2010, serving one term.

Landry defeated incumbent Louisiana attorney general Buddy Caldwell in 2015, and was reelected in 2019 with over 66% of the vote. During his tenure, he supported Louisiana's abortion ban, advocated for prayer in public schools, and pushed back against Governor John Bel Edwards's administration's advocacy of LGBTQ rights. Landry won the 2023 Louisiana gubernatorial election with a majority of the vote in the first round. As governor, he has signed several criminal justice bills, as well as legislation allowing the carrying of concealed weapons without a permit. He signed legislation requiring that the Ten Commandments be displayed in public school classrooms. A preliminary court injunction blocked the law for violating the Establishment Clause. On February 20, 2026, the Fifth Circuit U.S. Court of Appeals vacated that ruling by a 12 to 6 vote, allowing the law to be implemented while challenges are pending.

== Early life, education, and career ==
Landry was born in St. Martinville, Louisiana, on December 23, 1970, to Al and Edna (née Bienvenu) Landry. Both his parents are of Cajun ancestry. He is the eldest of four children. His mother was a teacher at Trinity Catholic School in St. Martinville. His father was an architect and businessman.

Landry graduated from St. Martinville High School, where he was a wide receiver on the high school football team. After graduating from high school, he held various jobs, including sugarcane farm worker, police officer for the village of Parks, and St. Martin Parish sheriff's deputy. He also spent 11 years in the Louisiana Army National Guard.

During his time as a St. Martin Parish deputy, he shared a rental home in St. Martinville with two friends, one a childhood friend, and the other a fellow deputy. The fellow deputy smuggled about $10,000 worth of cocaine and stashed it underneath their home. Once his roommates caught on to the crime, they turned him in to the police. The police executed a search warrant, which Landry signed. After the home was searched, his roommate lost his job and went to prison. After Landry's opponent in an acrimonious 2010 Republican primary election raised the incident, District Attorney J. Phil Haney said that Landry was never implicated in a crime, and Landry said he remained a reserve deputy until 2004.

Landry attended the University of Southwestern Louisiana (which later became the University of Louisiana at Lafayette), graduating in 1999 with an environmental science degree. In 2001, he enrolled in Southern University Law School as a part-time student; he transferred to Loyola University New Orleans College of Law in 2003 as a full-time student, and received his J.D. in December 2004. He then became an attorney and businessman in New Iberia.

== 2007 State Senate election ==
In 2007, Landry ran for Louisiana's 22nd Senate district when incumbent Republican state senator Craig Romero was term-limited. In the general election, he faced Democratic state Representative Troy Hebert of Jeanerette; Hebert later declared himself an Independent. Hebert defeated Landry, 51% to 49%.

== U.S. House of Representatives ==
=== Elections ===
==== 2010 ====
Landry entered the race to represent Louisiana's 3rd congressional district after Democratic incumbent Charlie Melancon relinquished the seat to run for U.S. Senate. Landry won the Republican nomination in the October 2 runoff election, defeating former Speaker of the Louisiana House of Representatives Hunt Downer of Houma, Louisiana, 19,657 votes to 10,549 votes (65%–35%).

==== 2012 ====
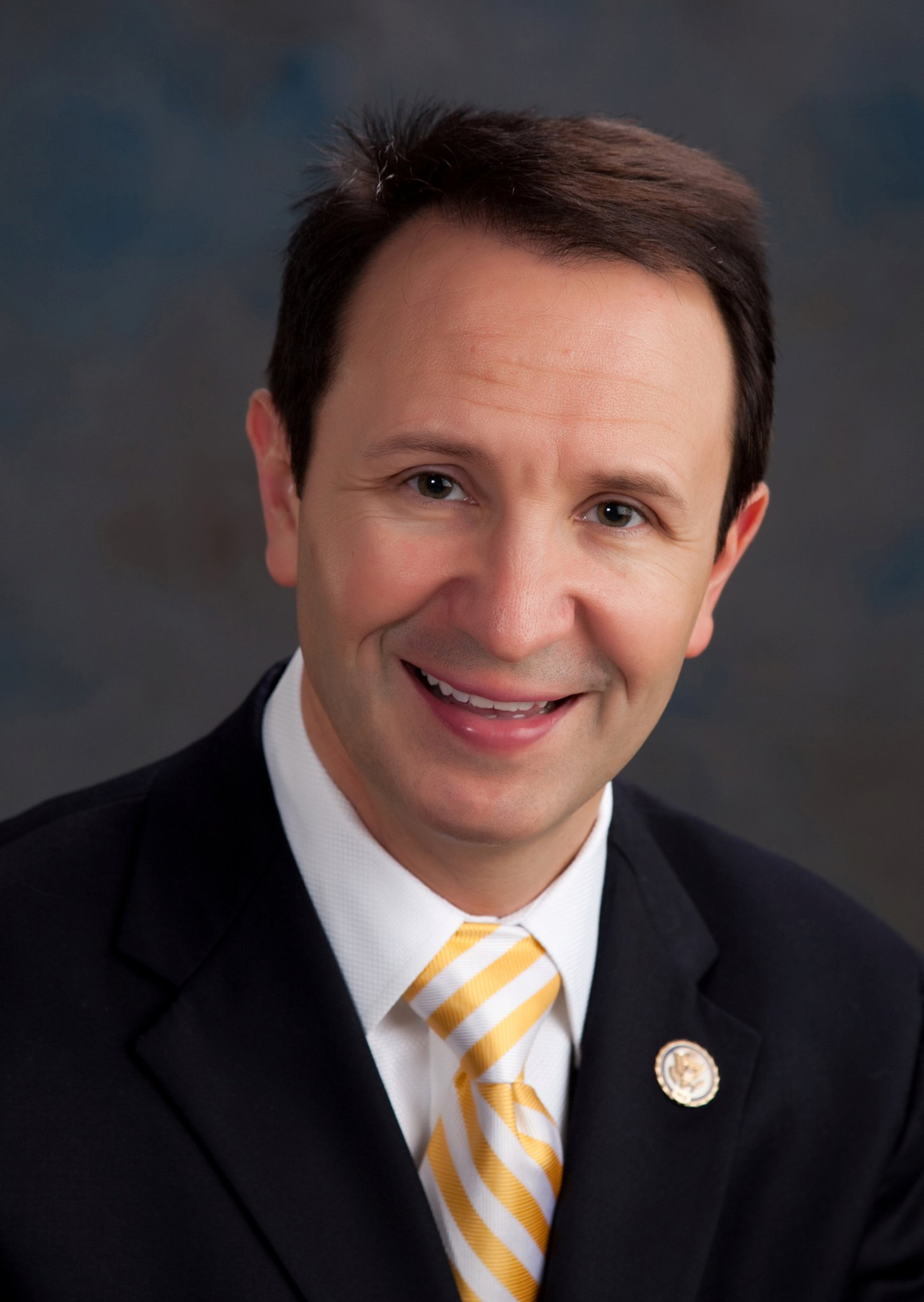
Landry during the 112th Congress

Louisiana lost a congressional district due to out-migration during Hurricanes Katrina and Rita. Landry's district was dismantled and its territory split among three neighboring districts. Landry was drawn into the same district as fellow Republican Charles Boustany of the neighboring 7th District. The new district retained Landry's district number—the 3rd—but geographically and demographically was more Boustany's district; Landry retained only the western third of his old district.

Citizens United and Phyllis Schlafly's Eagle Forum political action committee endorsed Landry. He led Boustany in third-quarter 2011 fundraising, $251,000 to $218,000. According to the Federal Election Commission, Boustany led in cash on hand, $1.1 million–$402,000.

In the November 6 election, Landry trailed Boustany by 45,596 votes. Boustany led the five-candidate field with 139,123 votes (44.7%); Landry received 93,527 (30%). Democrat Ron Richard procured 67,070 votes (21.5%); and 7,908 votes (2.5%) and 3,765 votes (1.2%) were cast for Republican Bryan Barrilleaux and Libertarian Jim Stark, respectively. Because none of the candidates received a majority, Boustany and Landry went into a runoff contest held on December 8.

Boustany defeated Landry with 58,820 votes (60.9%), to Landry's 37,764 (39.1%). Landry prevailed in three of the ten parishes in the revised district, all of which he then represented, including his home parish of St. Martin, his residence of Iberia, and St. Mary Parish.

=== Tenure ===
During his tenure in Congress, Landry was known as an advocate for the oil and natural gas industry. He heavily criticized President Obama, saying, "Republicans continue to criticize the president for being anti-oil. He says that's not true, but his actions don't match his rhetoric."

Landry made national headlines by holding up a sign saying "Drilling=jobs" during Obama's national jobs plan speech in September 2011. After the BP oil spill in the Gulf of Mexico, Landry opposed the liability cap on BP while supporting the Gulf Hurricane Protection Project.

In a June 2012 appearance on a radio program produced by the American Center for Law and Justice, Landry baselessly claimed that the Obama administration was "granting special status or waivers to Muslims as they go through TSA screenings." No such religious exemption existed.

In July 2012, Landry made local headlines when he declared his opposition to the establishment of a minor in LGBT studies at the University of Louisiana at Lafayette, and wrote a letter to the university's president, Joe Savoie, asking him to drop the minor. Savoie declined to do so, writing that the program "did not require budgetary allocations or divert resources from other areas" and that the university had a responsibility to impartially provide "an opportunity for investigation, analysis, and understanding" of controversial social issues.

== Attorney General of Louisiana (2016–2024) ==
=== Elections ===
==== 2015 ====
On February 24, 2014, Landry announced his challenge to Caldwell, who was first elected in 2007 as a Democrat. The Democratic nominee, Geri Broussard Baloney, an African-American lawyer from Garyville, endorsed Landry in the runoff contest. After he assumed office, Landry named Baloney's daughter, Quendi Baloney, to a position in his administration. The Baton Rouge Advocate questioned whether the appointment was made on merit or for political reasons. Landry defended his choice by citing the education and experience of Ms. Baloney, a graduate of George Washington University and Loyola University New Orleans College of Law who was formerly employed by the United States Department of Justice. She investigated housing discrimination by Donald Sterling, the owner of the Los Angeles Clippers. Baloney and her colleagues secured a $2.7 million settlement from Sterling.

==== 2019 ====
In August 2018, Landry indicated that he might forego his bid for reelection as attorney general in 2019 and instead challenge Governor John Bel Edwards, who was seeking a second term. Landry said that people everywhere approached him and urged him to seek the governorship. He said he might run unless U.S. Senator John N. Kennedy decided to enter the race, and called upon interested Republican candidates to announce their intentions. Landry had broken with Edwards on numerous political issues, including a 2018 voter referendum on requiring unanimous jury consent for felony convictions, rather than 10 of 12 jurors. Only Louisiana and Oregon have the lower threshold.

In November, Landry announced that he would not run for governor but instead seek reelection as attorney general.

Landry chairs the Louisiana Committee for a Conservative Majority, which targeted "Republican in Name Only" (RINO) state legislators in the 2019 elections. He has said he wants party faithful to rally around conservative orthodoxy, rather than a big tent.

On October 12, 2019, Landry was reelected by a 2–1 margin.

In December 2022, an investigation by The Advocate revealed that, starting in 2017, Landry misspent campaign funds on part of a car note on a Chevrolet Suburban. The Louisiana Board of Ethics decided not to take any action on the matter because the statute of limitations for action had expired. The $322 monthly payments ended in 2019 and totaled about $11,600.

=== Tenure ===
==== Abortion ====
Landry opposes access to abortion, and argued in favor of Louisiana's abortion ban. He recommended that anyone who disagrees with the policy, without exception for rape or incest or age, move to another state.

In August 2022, Landry twice urged the Louisiana State Bond Commission to delay funding for a power station that charges drainage pumps in New Orleans over the city's decriminalization of abortion following the state's near-total ban of abortion in July 2022. In September 2022, the commission approved the funding despite Landry's objections.

==== Academic freedom ====
In August 2012, Landry urged the University of Louisiana at Lafayette to eliminate its lesbian, gay, bisexual, and transgender studies minor, arguing that it did not align with the college's mission of preparing students for employment.

In December 2021, Landry urged Louisiana State University president William Tate to take disciplinary action against tenured mass communications professor Robert Mann for referring to one of Landry's staff members, Lauryn Sudduth, as a "flunkie" on Twitter. Mann's tweet read, "Louisiana AG Jeff Landry sending some flunkie to the LSU Faculty Senate meeting today to read a letter attacking covid vaccines is quite the move from a guy who considers himself 'pro-life.'"

==== Antitrust ====
Landry has urged bipartisan cooperation on antitrust enforcement, and endorsed President Joe Biden's nomination of Jonathan Kanter as Assistant Attorney General for the Antitrust Division.

==== Common Core ====
Soon after taking office as attorney general, Landry became embroiled in a public dispute with Governor Edwards over a lawsuit regarding the Common Core State Standards Initiative, which both men opposed. Edwards said the state would drop the appeal of a federal lawsuit to block the implementation of Common Core, declaring the lawsuit moot because of new federal legislation, the Every Student Succeeds Act, and a state legislative compromise agreed upon in 2015, the last year of the Bobby Jindal administration. Landry first replied that he would review the case and could proceed with the appeal to the federal court. Edwards wrote to Landry: "As in any case the client, not the attorney, should ultimately make the decisions on the course of action, and I have decided this case will not proceed." A few days later, Landry announced that, having reviewed the matter, he would defer to Edwards and drop the suit.

==== LGBT rights ====
In September 2016, Landry announced that he would block Edwards's attempt to require that state contracts protect gay and lesbian employees from discrimination based on sexual orientation. Edwards sued Landry over his refusal to approve the contracts. In a press conference, Landry vowed, "I will not cower to executive overreach; rather, I will continue to defend our Constitution and the will of the people." On December 14, 2016, Judge Todd Hernandez of Baton Rouge declared Edwards's order unconstitutional even though Edwards maintained that his directive exempted contractors who are also tied to religious organizations. Landry claimed that Edwards's directive would have established a new "protected class" that does not exist in state law. Landry had already successfully blocked dozens of legal services contracts that included the gay-rights language. He told radio talk show host Moon Griffon that he hoped his legal victory over Edwards would persuade him not to attempt to govern by executive orders to the extent that President Barack Obama did.

In March 2017, Edwards announced that he would appeal the LGBT case Landry won before Judge Hernandez. In a speech in West Monroe before the Ouachita Republican Women, Landry said that Edwards was "playing petty politics" by seeking cuts in the attorney general's office budget while state highways "continue to fail" and that U.S. News & World Report declared that Louisiana is "back to being 50th again" and was ranked "the worst state". Landry also said that Edwards voted for most of the Jindal administration's budgets yet continued to claim that he is blameless for the state's ongoing budget crisis, which he sought to resolve by raising taxes.

Landry's brother, Nicholas Landry, who is gay, posted an open letter on Facebook criticizing his brother's policies on LGBTQ issues.

==== Libraries ====
In December 2022, as attorney general, Landry established a tip line called "Protecting Minors" to address concerns related to librarians, teachers, and other personnel in schools and libraries. It allowed people to report complaints about libraries that, according to Landry, do not adequately protect children from issues such as early sexualization, grooming, sex trafficking, and abuse. Landry said he wanted to stop the "taxpayer-subsided sexualization of children." Most of the 5,500 pages of complaints submitted to the tip line were spam.

In February 2023, Landry drafted a report titled "Protecting Innocence" that focuses on libraries and supports legislation restricting minors' access to certain materials deemed obscene by local public library boards. Several books mentioned in the report contain LGBTQ themes. State Representative Julie Emerson and Senator Heather Cloud planned to submit bills to achieve those objectives. Board members from the Livingston Parish Library attended the press conference to show their support for the report. Among them was activist Connie Philips, member of the St. Tammany Parish Library Accountability Project. Philips has filed over 150 challenges to books at the St. Tammany Parish Library and allegedly assaulted someone outside a St. Tammany Parish Council meeting that discussed book restrictions. The Louisiana Library Association released a statement in response to the "Protecting Innocence" report titled "Setting the Record Straight".

==== Local control ====
In 2016, Landry became embroiled in a dispute with Mitch Landrieu, the Democratic mayor of New Orleans, over failed efforts to curtail street crime in New Orleans. Landry named a task force on the issue without consulting the Louisiana State Police or the New Orleans Police Department. He claimed that crime in New Orleans is "more dangerous than Chicago". NOPD Superintendent Michael S. Harrison said that Landry had ignored the city home rule charter and did not have the authority "to engage in active law enforcement in New Orleans." Landrieu claimed that Landry's task force had placed state troopers' and city police officers' lives in jeopardy.

==== Budget dispute ====
In April 2017, Landry again filed suit against Edwards; this time, he disputed the freezing of $4 million in an escrow fund obtained from a pharmaceutical settlement in 2013, when Buddy Caldwell was state attorney general. Landry claimed that his office was entitled to the funds because it must generate revenues to meet a portion of its own budget. Edwards replied that Landry was fighting budget cuts that have also been imposed on other state offices. "It's another dog and pony show", Edwards said of the suit. Landry called Edwards "an emperor ... a predictable and vindictive Washington-style politician more concerned with political points than the people's business. By playing petty partisan politics, the governor is jeopardizing the operations of the Louisiana Department of Justice." Three months later, Landry withdrew the suit, which became moot after State Senator Bret Allain, vice chair of the Senate Finance Committee, brokered a compromise that transferred $2.7 million to Landry's office operations.

==== DACA ====
In July 2017, Texas Attorney General Ken Paxton led a group of Republican attorneys general from nine other states, including Louisiana, as well as Idaho Governor Butch Otter, in threatening the Donald Trump administration that they would litigate if Trump did not terminate the Deferred Action for Childhood Arrivals policy that President Obama had put into place. Tennessee Attorney General Herbert Slatery reversed his position and withdrew his participation in the proposed suit on August 31. Slatery went further, urging passage of the DREAM Act.

==== Religious views ====
In April 2018, Landry joined U.S. Representative Mike Johnson of Louisiana's 4th congressional district and Christian actor Kirk Cameron to argue under the First Amendment for student-led prayer and religious expression in public schools. Landry and Johnson appeared with Cameron on a promotional video and at prayer rallies at the First Baptist Church of Minden and Bossier Parish Community College in Bossier City. The gatherings were organized by area pastors, including Brad Jurkovich of First Baptist Bossier, in response to a lawsuit filed in February against the Bossier Parish School Board and the superintendent, Scott Smith. The board and the superintendent were accused of allowing teachers to incorporate various aspects of Christianity in their class presentations.

==== NAAG presidency ====
In 2018, Landry was elected to a one-year term as president of the National Association of Attorneys General. In 2019, Landry declined to sign a letter in support of the SAFE Banking Act, which would permit marijuana-related businesses to use the banking system.

==== 2020 U.S. presidential election ====
On December 8, 2020, Texas Attorney General Ken Paxton sued the states of Georgia, Michigan, Wisconsin, and Pennsylvania, where certified results showed Joe Biden the electoral victor over President Trump. Landry joined the lawsuit and an amicus brief filed by the Missouri AG, seeking to overturn the results of the presidential election by challenging election processes in four states Trump lost. 16 other state attorneys general who supported Paxton's challenge of the election results alleged numerous instances of unconstitutional actions in the four states' presidential ballot tallies, arguments that had already been rejected in other state and federal courts. In Texas v. Pennsylvania, Paxton asked the United States Supreme Court to invalidate the four states' combined 62 electoral votes, allowing Trump to be declared the winner of the election. On December 11, the U.S. Supreme Court quickly rejected the suit in an unsigned opinion.

==== Vaccines ====
In 2021, Landry sued the federal government for a requirement that health care workers be vaccinated against COVID-19, calling the requirement an "unconstitutional and immoral attack" on health care workers. He has accepted $25,000 in political donations from American pharmaceutical and biotechnology company Pfizer as of 2024.

In 2024, Landry signed five bills into law that loosened vaccine requirements, limited the power of public health authorities, and cast doubt on the safety of vaccines.

==== Whistleblower lawsuit ====
In November 2021, the former district attorney's office criminal division deputy director, Matthew Derbes, sued Landry, alleging that he not only concealed records instrumental to Derbes's sexual harassment complaints, but also retaliated against Derbes. The previous year, Derbes filed a complaint against his immediate supervisor, Pat Magee, over his inappropriate treatment of women in the office. According to the suit, investigations were hampered by the office and the complaints were deliberately mischaracterized to avoid the reporting requirements. Additionally, when reporters filed public-records requests, Landry sued and asked a judge to seal all records, something that the editor of The Advocate, Peter Kovacs, characterized as wholly egregious, saying, "In my 40 years as an editor, I’ve never seen a journalist get sued for requesting a public record". A judge sided with the press and, once new complaints arose against Magee, he resigned. Following the resignation, Landry released a memo with enough publicly identifiable information to expose Derbes as the whistleblower.

== Governor of Louisiana (2024–present) ==
=== 2023 election ===
On October 5, 2022, Landry launched his campaign for governor of Louisiana in the 2023 election. He was endorsed by the Republican Party of Louisiana and former president Donald Trump. In September 2023, the Louisiana Board of Ethics charged Landry with accepting a gift in relation to his position as state attorney general. Landry was also accused of accepting private air travel from campaign donors. Furthermore, the charging document claims Landry did not report the complimentary flights in financial disclosures to the Ethics Board. Landry called the charges "election interference" and blamed Governor Edwards, who appoints board members.

Landry was elected governor in the primary election on October 14, 2023, with 52% of the vote, averting a runoff election. His closest competitor, Democrat and former Louisiana transportation secretary Shawn Wilson, received 25% of the vote.

=== Tenure ===
On January 7, 2024, Landry took a ceremonial oath and delivered his inaugural address on the steps of the Louisiana State Capitol; the event was held a day before he took office as governor due to expectations for bad weather. The Louisiana state constitution requires gubernatorial terms to begin at noon on the second Monday in January.

==== Redistricting efforts and controversy ====
Two weeks after taking office, on January 22, 2024, Landry signed a redistricting bill the state legislature had passed to redraw Louisiana's congressional districts, in order to comply with a federal court order requiring that a second Black-majority district be created in the state under the terms of the Voting Rights Act. In May, he signed a bill that redrew Louisiana's seven State Supreme Court districts for the first time in over two decades, creating a second Black-majority district in the process per the recommendation of five of the state's Supreme Court justices.

Several political and civil rights groups have claimed the proposed maps are still gerrymandered, with Landry signing the legislation with the intent of unseating Congressman Garret Graves, who endorsed Stephen Waguespack during the gubernatorial election.

==== Criminal justice reform and gun laws ====
In March 2024, Landry signed several bills that reversed criminal justice reforms initiated by the 2017 Justice Reinvestment Initiative. He eliminated parole, dramatically cut the ability of convicts to earn points for good behavior in prison, increased penalties for carjackings and weapons offenses, and permitted two more methods of execution (nitrogen gas and electrocution). Within the first two years of Landry's tenure, the number of state prisoners increased by about 8%. He signed a bill to allow people to carry concealed handguns without permits.

On February 10, 2025, Landry announced that Louisiana had finalized its new execution protocol, allowing executions to be carried out there for the first time in 15 years. On March 18, 2025, Jessie Hoffman Jr., who was convicted of murder in 1996, was executed by nitrogen hypoxia, becoming the first person executed in Louisiana since 2010; Louisiana also became the second state to conduct a nitrogen gas execution, after Alabama.

==== Ten Commandments law ====
In June 2024, Louisiana became the first state to mandate posting the Ten Commandments in every public school classroom. Landry signed the bill into law and called it "one of my favorites". Days before signing it, he said: "I can't wait to be sued" over the law. Hours after its signing, four civil liberties groups challenged the law. Landry said that the law's implementation showed that the Republican "majority gets to rule" in Louisiana, while instructing parents who were opposed to the display of the Commandments: "Tell your child not to look at them". A district judge blocked the bill but Attorney General of Louisiana Liz Murrill revealed plans to appeal the decision.

On February 20, 2026, the Fifth Circuit Court of Appeals vacated U.S. District Judge John DeGravelles's November 2024 preliminary injunction (Rev. Roake v. Brumley) by a 12 to 6 vote. The law may thus be implemented while challenges are pending. The case Rabbi Nathan v. Alamo Heights Independent School District, concerning a similar law in Texas, is also under the jurisdiction of the Fifth Circuit Court of Appeals. On March 18, 2026, the ACLU of Louisiana filed to have the case brought before the U.S. Supreme Court.

==== Academic freedom ====
In June 2024, Landry enacted a law that excludes acts of civil disobedience from free speech protections on college campuses. Senate Bill 294, introduced by Senator Valarie Hodges, was presented as a pro-free speech measure aiming to "shore up protections" for campus speech, and Hodges made several references to the pro-Palestinian protests that have become common on campuses since the outbreak of the Gaza war. "This bill protects free speech for everyone but makes it very clear that criminal activity and pro-terrorist, giving support to terrorist groups, does not belong on our college campuses", Hodges said.

In October 2024, Landry held a press conference at LSU's Memorial Tower to announce an executive order aimed at enhancing the protection of free speech on public university campuses. The executive order was signed in collaboration with LSU's chapter of Turning Point USA. The order addresses concerns about campus reporting systems that allow students to report behavior they perceive as discriminatory based on factors such as age, race, gender identity, or sexual orientation. While these reporting systems are intended to address issues of marginalization, the order warns that they may unintentionally discourage open dialogue and expressive conduct on public post-secondary campuses. It suggests that, although designed to promote inclusivity, such systems could limit free speech by creating an environment where people feel hesitant to share differing viewpoints.

In November 2024, Landry urged LSU to take disciplinary action against professor Nicholas Bryner, the director of LSU's Climate Change Law and Policy Project. During a class, Bryner commented on the 2024 presidential election, and someone later forwarded a video of those comments to Landry, who shared it on social media. Bryner said, in part, "And I don't know if anybody falls in that category, but if you voted for Trump on the idea that you don't like him personally but that you like his policies, I just want you to think about the message that that sends to other people and how you can prove that by treating other people in a way that matches that sentiment." On January 14, 2025, during a class, tenured LSU law professor Ken Levy criticized Landry for his treatment of Bryner. He also commented on recent changes in case law related to the Fourth, Fifth, and Sixth Amendments and shared his views on Donald Trump. Additionally, Levy identified himself as a Democrat. Afterward, he received a letter notifying him of his removal from his teaching position. On January 31, Judge Donald Johnson, a district judge in East Baton Rouge Parish, ruled that LSU must allow Levy to return to teaching immediately. Johnson issued a temporary restraining order stating that LSU cannot violate Levy's free speech rights and must refrain from any further harassment or retaliation against him. On February 4, a three-judge panel of the 1st Circuit Court of Appeal ruled that it was premature to require LSU to reinstate Levy, but affirmed that LSU may not interfere with his employment or infringe upon his free speech or due process rights. Landry criticized Levy's behavior on social media, saying, "No judge would tolerate this conduct in their courtroom or any legal professional setting. It should not be tolerated at our taxpayer funded universities either." On February 11, Judge Tarvald Smith ruled that LSU must allow Levy to return to teaching. The judge determined that LSU had not adhered to its policies in the removal process. During the hearing, LSU President William Tate said he had decided to remove Levy. Additionally, LSU lawyer Carlton Jones was dismissed for discussing the case with LSU Law School dean Alena Allen, who had been subpoenaed as a witness. On X, Landry wrote, "This ruling is absurd! It not only disregards the law and the facts, but it also disrespects the many Louisiana citizens who are demanding a higher level of professionalism in our universities. The judge ignored the facts, the law, and the Constitution — but unfortunately, that is what we have come to expect."

On June 11, 2025, Kimberly Terrell, the director of community engagement at Tulane University's Environmental Law Clinic, resigned. Terrell's research focuses on the health impacts of Louisiana's petrochemical industry and that sector's racial disparities in hiring practices. In an email exchange, Marcilynn Burke, the dean of Tulane's law school, disclosed that Tulane president Michael Fitts was concerned that the clinic's efforts could jeopardize support for the university's anticipated downtown expansion project. Terrell said she had been told that Landry threatened to veto any state funding for the expansion unless Fitts "took action" regarding the clinic. A spokesperson for Landry said Terrell's claim was "not accurate".

On July 22, 2025, Landry signed an executive order for Louisiana to join the state university systems of Florida, Georgia, North Carolina, South Carolina, Tennessee, and Texas in becoming part of the Commission for Public Higher Education (CPHE). This organization serves as an alternative accrediting body to the Southern Association of Colleges and Schools (SACS). Conservative politicians have raised concerns about SACS due to its diversity, equity, and inclusion requirements, as well as its restrictions against outside influence, including political interference, in public higher education.

==== 2025 New Orleans truck attack ====
Landry faced criticism for his response to the 2025 New Orleans truck attack. Hours after the January 1 attack, he posted a photo of himself smiling and giving a thumbs-up with his wife and others outside a steakhouse in the city. He captioned the photo, "Ate dinner tonight in New Orleans. Proud to be a part of this incredibly resilient city. See everyone at the game tomorrow!" This referred to the Sugar Bowl, which had been postponed due to the attack. In response to the criticism, Landry said: "It’s important to understand that we have many visitors in the city of New Orleans right now. Safety is our top priority, and we want our guests and the world to know that Louisiana does not cower to radical Islamic terrorists. Our restaurants and all that New Orleans has to offer remain open for business!"

==== Super Bowl busing ====
Ahead of Super Bowl LIX, Landry invoked emergency powers to destroy the encampments and order the busing of more than 100 unhoused people to a "transitional center" he arranged under a no-bid contract. The site lacked heating or blankets. Press was not permitted to enter the site. Landry's administration requested that the U.S. Department of Homeland Security reimburse $50 million the state spent to enhance security and operate the temporary shelter. The final cost was just over $52 million: $43.5 million for equipment and services and $8.6 million for personnel. The federal government denied the request, citing insufficient supplemental FEMA funding.

==== 2025 LSU football coach search ====
On October 26, 2025, a day after the Tigers dropped to 5–3 overall with a home loss to Texas A&M, LSU fired head coach Brian Kelly.

Landry told reporters that the LSU Board of Supervisors would form a committee to find the next coach rather than leaving the decision to athletic director Scott Woodward. "I can tell you right now, Scott Woodward is not selecting the next coach", he said at a press conference. "Hell, I'll let Donald Trump select it before I let him do it. He loves winners. You know, I'm not going to be picking the next coach, but I can promise you we're gonna pick a coach and we're gonna make sure that that coach is successful."

Landry criticized the contracts that Woodward reached with the last two football coaches that he hired, Jimbo Fisher at Texas A&M and Kelly at LSU. A few years after Woodward left Texas A&M for LSU, Fisher signed a lucrative extension in 2021, the year LSU hired Kelly.

On October 30, it was announced that Woodward and LSU athletics had parted ways after Landry's decision to exclude Woodward from the hiring of the new coach.

== U.S. special envoy to Greenland (2025–present) ==
On December 22, 2025, President Donald Trump appointed Landry as "United States Special Envoy to Greenland", a territory of the Kingdom of Denmark. The role was described as informal and one-sided, and Landry is not a formal envoy or diplomat to Greenland, with no diplomatic status or accreditation in Denmark. Landry said he would work to "make Greenland part of the U.S." Denmark condemned the move, and both the Danish government and the Greenlandic home rule government demanded respect for its borders. Denmark summoned the American ambassador, Ken Howery. Danish government officials were described as "incensed" at attempts to undermine Denmark's sovereignty, and Foreign Minister Lars Løkke Rasmussen called Landry's statements "completely unacceptable", adding, "we insist that everyone—including the US—must show respect for the territorial integrity of the Kingdom of Denmark."

== Personal life ==
Landry and his wife, Sharon Landry (née LeBlanc), have one son. He and his family are Roman Catholic.

== Electoral history ==
Louisiana State Senate 22nd District primary election, 2007
Party	Candidate	Votes	%
Republican	"Jeff" Landry	13,375	35
Democratic	Troy Hebert	12,648	33
Democratic	Sydnie Mae Maraist Durand	12,375	32

Louisiana State Senate 22nd District runoff election, 2007
Party	Candidate	Votes	%
Democratic	Troy Hebert	14,876	51
Republican	"Jeff" Landry	14,308	49

Louisiana's 3rd Congressional District Republican primary election, 2010
Party	Candidate	Votes	%
Republican	"Jeff" Landry	19,657	65
Republican	"Hunt" Downer	10,549	35

Louisiana's 3rd Congressional District Election, 2010
Party	Candidate	Votes	%
Republican	"Jeff" Landry	108,943	64
Democratic	Ravi Sangisetty	61,914	36

Louisiana's 3rd Congressional District primary election, 2012
Party	Candidate	Votes	%
Republican	Charles Boustany Jr.	139,123	45
Republican	"Jeff" Landry (inc.)	93,527	30
Democratic	"Ron" Richard	67,070	22
Republican	Bryan Barrilleaux	7,908	3
Libertarian	"Jim" Stark	3,765	1

Louisiana's 3rd Congressional District runoff election, 2012
Party	Candidate	Votes	%
Republican	Charles Boustany Jr.	58,820	61
Republican	"Jeff" Landry (inc.)	37,767	39

Louisiana Attorney General primary election, 2015
Party	Candidate	Votes	%
Republican	James "Buddy" Caldwell (inc.)	376,407	35
Republican	"Jeff" Landry	347,605	33
Democratic	Geraldine "Geri" Broussard Baloney	187,575	18
Democratic	Isaac "Ike" Jackson	115,118	11
Republican	"Marty" Maley	37,830	4

Louisiana Attorney General runoff election, 2015
Party	Candidate	Votes	%
Republican	"Jeff" Landry	610,459	56
Republican	James "Buddy" Caldwell (inc.)	473,915	44

Louisiana Attorney General election, 2019
Party	Candidate	Votes	%
Republican	"Jeff" Landry (incumbent)	855,338	66
Democratic	Isaac "Ike" Jackson	436,531	34

Louisiana gubernatorial election, 2023
Party	Candidate	Votes	%
Republican	"Jeff" Landry	547,827	52
Democratic	Shawn Wilson	275,525	26
Republican	Stephen Waguespack	62,287	6
Republican	John Schroder	56,654	5

== Notes ==
U.S. House of Representatives
Preceded by Charlie Melancon	Member of the U.S. House of Representatives from Louisiana's 3rd congressional district 2011–2013	Succeeded by Charles Boustany
Legal offices
Preceded by Buddy Caldwell	Attorney General of Louisiana; 2016–2024	Succeeded by Liz Murrill
Party political offices
Preceded by Buddy Caldwell	Republican nominee for Attorney General of Louisiana; 2019	Succeeded by Liz Murrill
Preceded by Eddie Rispone	Republican nominee for Governor of Louisiana; 2023	Most recent
Political offices
Preceded by John Bel Edwards	Governor of Louisiana; 2024–present	Incumbent
U.S. order of precedence (ceremonial)
Preceded by JD Vance as Vice President	Order of precedence of the United States; Within Louisiana	Succeeded by Mayor of city in which event is held
Preceded by JD Vance as Vice President	Order of precedence of the United States; Within Louisiana	Succeeded by Otherwise Mike Johnson as Speaker of the United States House of Representatives
Preceded by Mike DeWine as Governor of Ohio	Order of precedence of the United States; Outside Louisiana	Succeeded by Mike Braun as Governor of Indiana
