= Abortion in Alaska =

Abortion in Alaska is legal at all stages of pregnancy to birth. In September 2024, an Alaska superior court judge struck down the requirement that only licensed physicians provide abortions, meaning that the procedure can now also be legally performed by nurse practitioners and physician assistants. As of 2016, Alaska does not require a minor to notify a parent or guardian in order to obtain an abortion. 63% of adults said in a poll by the Pew Research Center that abortion should be legal in all or most cases. The 2023 American Values Atlas reported that, in their most recent survey, 69% of Alaskans said that abortion should be legal in all or most cases. Alaska was one of only four states to make abortion legal between 1967 and 1970, a few years before the US Supreme Court's decision in 1973's Roe v. Wade ruling. Alaska had consent requirements for women seeking abortions by 2007 that required abortion providers to warn patients of a link between abortion and breast cancer, despite it being scientifically unsupported.

The number of abortion clinics in Alaska has been declining, going from fourteen in 1982 to thirteen in 1992 to three in 2014. 1,547 abortions took place in Alaska in 2014, and 1,459 took place in 2015. There is state funding for abortions based on income.

== History ==
Alaska, California, and New Hampshire did not voluntarily provide the Center for Disease Control with abortion related data in 2000 or 2001. In 2014, a poll by the Pew Research Center reported that 63% of adults in the state of Alaska believe abortion should be legal in all or most cases, with 34% stating it should be illegal in all or most cases.

=== Legislative history ===
Alaska, Hawaii, Washington, and New York were the only four states that made abortion legal between 1967 and 1970 that did not require a reason to request an abortion. In 1970, the state repealed some of its abortion laws, along with Hawaii, New York, and Washington. The following year, Alaska repealed its statute that said inducing an abortion was a criminal offense. State law still required in 1971 that any woman getting a legal abortion in the state needed to be a resident for some specific period between 30 and 90 days.

Some states, such as Alaska, Mississippi, West Virginia, Texas, and Kansas, have passed laws requiring abortion providers to warn patients of a link between abortion and breast cancer, and to issue other scientifically unsupported warnings. The state was one of 23 states in 2007 to have a detailed abortion-specific informed consent requirement. Alaska and Minnesota both require that women seeking abortions after 20 weeks be informed that, while experts disagree on the issue of whether or not a fetus can feel pain at 20 weeks, it is possible.

House Bill 250 was introduced in 2017 by Rep. David Eastman (R-Wasilla). The bill was called the "Life at Conception Act", and it never made it out of committee in Alaska's House. In 2017, Washington State, New Mexico, Illinois, Alaska, Maryland, Massachusetts, Connecticut, and New Jersey allow, by state law qualified non-physicians to prescribe drugs for medical abortions only. In May 2019, Eastman introduced House Bill 178, which defines abortion as "murder of an unborn child"; the bill was never heard before a committee.

In 2022, Governor Mike Dunleavy expressed interest in an amendment to the Alaska Constitution clarifying the legality of abortion in the state. 2022 happened to be the year that Alaska's regularly scheduled ballot question for calling a state constitutional convention was asked. Dunleavy and other anti-abortion advocates recommended voting "yes", but the question was resoundingly defeated, with 70% voting "no".

In 2023, the bipartisan coalition majority in the Alaska State Senate is consensus-focused and unlikely to address controversial topics like abortion.

=== Judicial history ===
The US Supreme Court's decision in 1973's Roe v. Wade ruling meant the state could no longer regulate abortion in the first trimester.

Results by state house district of the 1972 privacy referendum Yes: 90–100%; 80–90%; 70–80%

In 1997, the Alaska Supreme Court ruled in Valley Hospital Association, Inc. v. Mat-Su Coalition for Choice that the privacy clause of the Alaska Constitution, which was adopted by referendum in 1972, protects the right to an abortion. This ruling remains in effect after the US Supreme Court overruled Roe v. Wade in 2022.

In 2016, the Alaska Supreme Court struck down a parental notification law that had been established in 2010.

In September 2024, an Alaska superior court judge struck down the requirement that only licensed physicians provide abortions, meaning that the procedure can now also be legally performed by nurse practitioners and physician assistants.

=== Clinic history ===
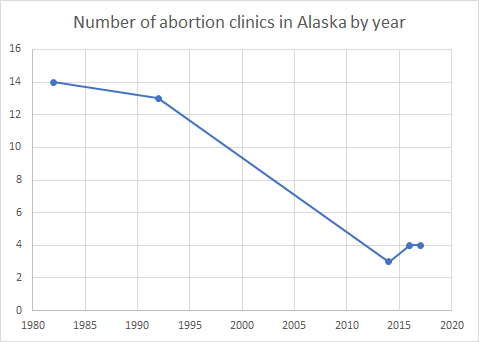
Number of abortion clinics in Alaska by year

Between 1982 and 1992, the number of abortion clinics in the state decreased by one, going from fourteen in 1982 to thirteen in 1992. In 2014, there were three abortion clinics in the state. 90% of the boroughs in the state did not have an abortion clinic. That year, 37% of women in the state aged 15–44 lived in a borough without an abortion clinic. In March 2016, there were four Planned Parenthood clinics in the state. In 2017, there were still four Planned Parenthood clinics, all of which offered abortion services, in a state with a population of 167,815 women aged 15–49. In 2022, there were three Planned Parenthood clinics in the state. By 2025, there were two Planned Parenthood clinics.

== Statistics ==
In 1990, 69,000 women in the state faced the risk of an unintended pregnancy. In 2013, among white women aged 15–19, there were 130 abortions, 10 abortions for black women aged 15–19, 20 abortions for Hispanic women aged 15–19, and 70 abortions for women of all other races. In 2017, the state had an infant mortality rate of 5.6 deaths per 1,000 live births.

Number of reported abortions, abortion rate and percentage change in rate by geographic region and state in 1992, 1995 and 1996
Census division and state	Number			Rate			% change 1992–1996
Census division and state	1992	1995	1996	1992	1995	1996	% change 1992–1996
US Total	1,528,930	1,363,690	1,365,730	25.9	22.9	22.9	–12
Pacific	368,040	290,520	288,190	38.7	30.5	30.1	–22
Alaska	2,370	1,990	2,040	16.5	14.2	14.6	–11
California	304,230	240,240	237,830	42.1	33.4	33	–22
Hawaii	12,190	7,510	6,930	46	29.3	27.3	–41
Oregon	16,060	15,590	15,050	23.9	22.6	21.6	–10
Washington	33,190	25,190	26,340	27.7	20.2	20.9	–24

Number, rate, and ratio of reported abortions, by reporting area of residence and occurrence and by percentage of abortions obtained by out-of-state residents, US CDC estimates
Location	Residence			Occurrence			% obtained by out-of-state residents	Year	Ref
Location	No.	Rate^	Ratio^^	No.	Rate^	Ratio^^	% obtained by out-of-state residents	Year	Ref
Alaska				1,990	16.5			1992	
Alaska				2,040	14.2			1995	
Alaska				16.5	14.6			1996	
Alaska	1,647	11.2	145	1,518	10.3	133	1.0	2014	
Alaska	1,459	10	129	1,334	9.1	118	0.5	2015	
Alaska	1,408	9.6	126	1,260	8.5	112	0.6	2016	
^number of abortions per 1,000 women aged 15–44; ^^number of abortions per 1,000 live births

== Abortion financing ==
17 US states, including Alaska, use their own funds to cover all or most "medically necessary" abortions sought by low-income women under Medicaid, 13 of which are required by State court orders to do so. In 2010, the state had 835 publicly funded abortions, all of which were state funded.

== Abortion rights views and activities ==
=== Protests ===
Women from the state participated in marches supporting abortion rights as part of a #StoptheBans movement in May 2019. Hundreds of women attended a rally in Anchorage at Town Square Park to protest legislation proposed in Alaska's House to restrict abortion rights. The event was organized by Planned Parenthood Votes and Alaska ACLU. There was another rally at the Alaska Capitol in Juneau in May 2019, in opposition to the bill proposed by Republican Rep. David Eastman of Wasilla.

Following the leak of the overturning of Roe v. Wade on May 2, 2022, Alaska saw abortion rights protests in Anchorage, Fairbanks, and Haines.

== Anti-abortion views and activism ==
=== Views ===
Rep. David Eastman (R-Wasilla) was censured by the Alaska Legislature in 2017 after he claimed that women used Medicaid support for abortion as a "free trip to the city".

=== Protests ===
A small counter-protest was organized by anti-abortion rights activists at the Alaska Capitol in Juneau in May 2019, in support of proposed restrictions on women's ability to access legal abortions in the state.
