= Ruben Sim =

American YouTuber (born 1997)

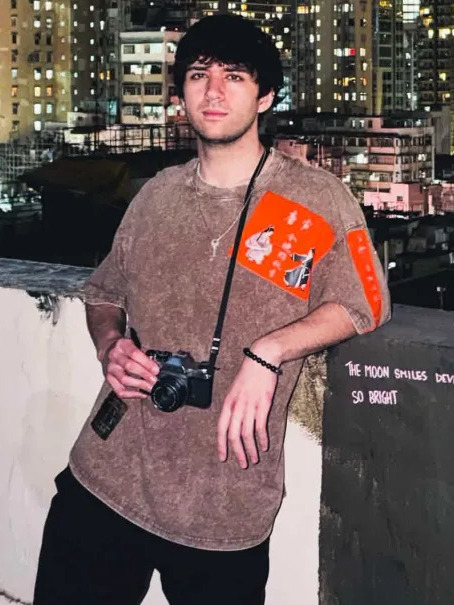
- Simon in March 2026
- Born: Benjamin Robert Simon; May 12, 1997 (age 29); United States
- Occupation: YouTuber

YouTube information
- Channel: Ruben Sim
- Years active: 2010–present
- Genres: Gaming; comedy; criticism
- Subscribers: 1.35 million
- Views: 251.5 million
- Ruben Sim's voice Ruben Sim explaining his satirical web series Roblox Watch; Recorded 2018
- Last updated: November 15, 2026

Benjamin Robert Simon (born May 12, 1997), known online as Ruben Sim, is an American YouTuber known for his commentary and criticism of the online game platform Roblox. Simon began producing content about Roblox throughout the 2010s, building a large audience through satirical videos and investigative commentary.

In November 2021, Roblox Corporation filed a $1.65 million federal lawsuit against Simon, alleging that he had harassed other users and developers and posted tweets containing false terrorist threats that prompted the temporary lockdown of a Roblox developer conference. The litigation was settled out of court in January 2022, with Simon agreeing to a $150,000 monetary judgment without admitting wrongdoing, alongside accepting a legal permanent injunction banning him from the platform. Simon later publicly accused the corporation of using the lawsuit to silence his ongoing criticisms of their alleged child safety and moderation failures.

Following the settlement, Simon shifted the focus of his channel to exposing online predators within the Roblox community. His investigations contributed to the FBI arrest of a prominent Roblox game developer and the creation of "Moderation for Dummies", an initiative to document explicit content on the Roblox platform. In 2025, Simon became a central figure in a broader community controversy after publicly defending and collaborating with YouTuber Schlep, a fellow creator banned by the corporation for conducting unauthorized sting operations against alleged predators on the platform.

== YouTube career ==
=== Early career ===
Simon joined the online gaming platform Roblox in 2008, later building a large audience on YouTube under the pseudonym Ruben Sim. Among Simon's earliest content is a satirical news web series titled Roblox Watch, which critiqued the executive decisions of Roblox Corporation. Simon claimed that conflicts with the game's moderation team over the content led to the platform issuing IP bans against him. Roblox Corporation, however, alleged in its 2021 complaint that Simon had been banned for harassing other players, as well as using homophobic and racist slurs. Simon continued to bypass these restrictions by creating alternative accounts. By November 2021, Simon's YouTube channel had amassed over 763,000 subscribers.

=== Roblox Corporation v. Simon ===
Avatar of Ruben Sim

Ruben Sim
(@realRubenSim)
tweeted:

gonna make the very smart decision to not comment on the complaint roblox lodged against me cause i wanna make my lawyer's and the court's job as easy as possible. when all of this is said and done you can have my side of the story. i'll still be uploading vids as usual.

November 24, 2021

On November 23, 2021, Roblox Corporation filed a lawsuit against Simon in the United States District Court for the Northern District of California. The complaint, which invoked the Computer Fraud and Abuse Act, sought $1.65 million in damages for alleged fraud and breach of contract. The lawsuit alleged Simon had led a "cybermob" to harass users, repeatedly circumvented a permanent platform-wide ban and posted false and misleading terrorist threats on social media, which prompted a temporary lockdown of the 2021 Roblox Developers Conference in San Francisco.

Simon initially declined to comment on the lawsuit, stating on Twitter that he wanted to simplify the legal proceedings. The litigation concluded on January 14, 2022, when both parties agreed to a settlement formalized in a court-approved stipulated order. Under the terms of the settlement, Simon agreed to a $150,000 monetary judgment without admitting wrongdoing. He also accepted a permanent injunction banning him from the platform, as well as barring him from coming within 100 feet of any Roblox corporate office.

Following the settlement, Simon publicly addressed several of the lawsuit's allegations, broadly denying the corporation's most severe claims. He maintained that the corporation weaponized his past terms of service violations to aggressively police his off-platform conduct and silence his ongoing criticisms of their alleged child safety and moderation failures.

=== Child safety advocacy ===
In the years preceding and following his court-ordered ban from Roblox, Simon increasingly focused his YouTube channel on exposing alleged child predators and criticizing the platform's safety infrastructure.

==== Arrest of Arnold Castillo ====
During September 2020, Simon began investigating a prominent Roblox game developer known by the alias DoctorRofatnik, later identified as Arnold Castillo. Following a video published by Simon that compiled evidence of Castillo's predatory behavior, Roblox Corporation banned the DoctorRofatnik account and reported it to the National Center for Missing & Exploited Children. Despite these actions, Castillo circumvented the ban using alternative accounts, and continued development on his Sonic the Hedgehog Roblox fan game, "Sonic Eclipse". Later, prompted by user tweets detailing Castillo's behavior, video game developer Sega filed a copyright infringement notice against Castillo's game, and it was removed from the platform by late 2021.

Castillo later utilized the platform to groom a 15-year-old girl, whom he subsequently abducted and sexually assaulted in May 2022. This incident occurred 18 months after Simon and the wider community had publicly outed Castillo as a predator. Following a federal investigation and his arrest by the Federal Bureau of Investigation, Castillo pleaded guilty to federal charges. In August 2023, he was given a 15-year sentence in federal prison.

==== Moderation for Dummies ====
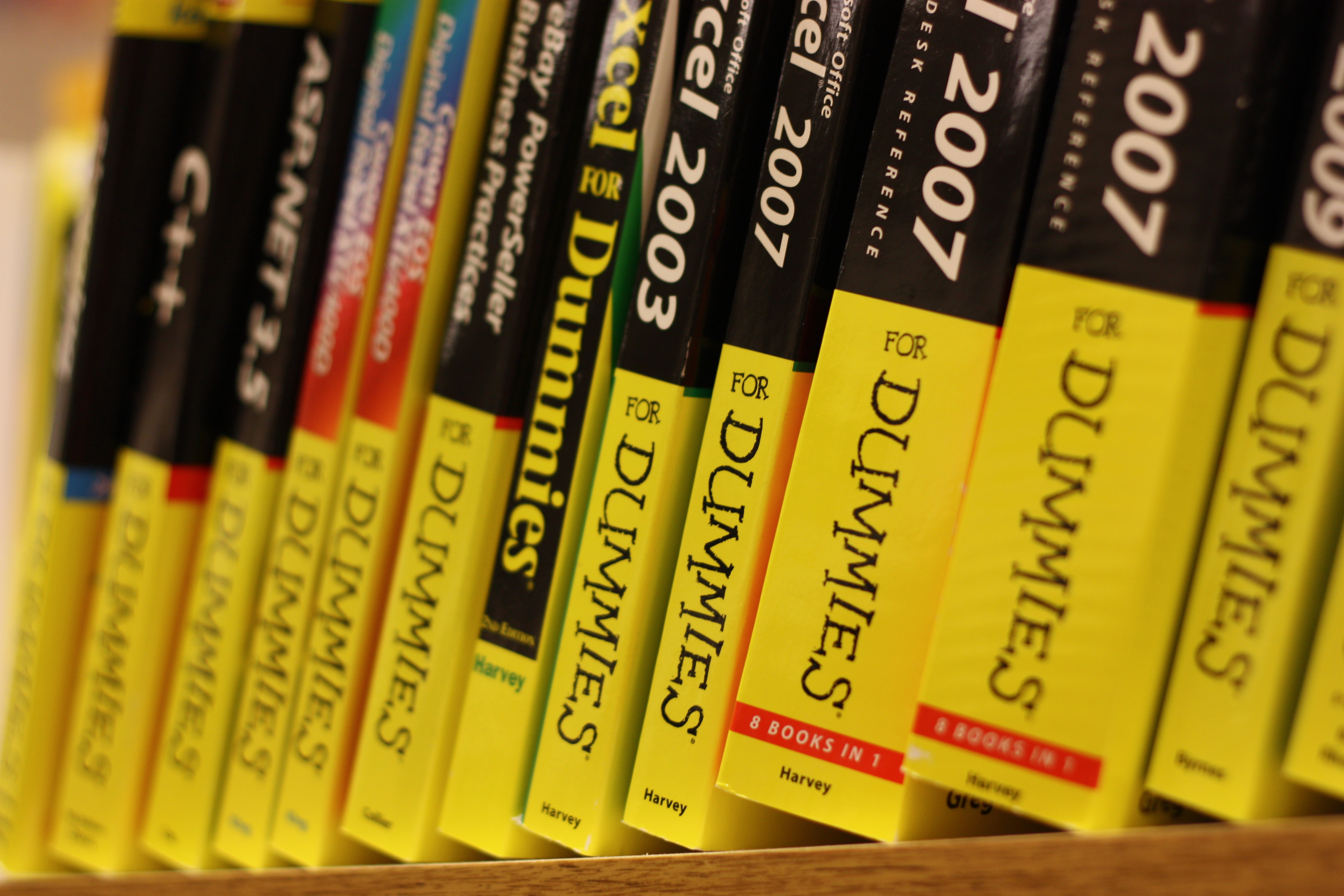
"Moderation for Dummies" is a play on the popular For Dummies series of reference books

To document alleged systemic failures in Roblox Corporation's safety infrastructure, Simon established "Moderation for Dummies", an initiative to monitor explicit behavior on the Roblox platform.

In October 2024, the investment research firm Hindenburg Research utilized Simon's data in a short-seller report that accused the corporation of inflating user metrics and ignoring child safety. The report cited "Moderation for Dummies" as an indication of explicit content on the platform, noting the initiative had identified approximately 12,400 accounts engaging in erotic roleplay on Roblox since September 2024. Later, Australian advocacy group Collective Shout cited these documents in formal government submissions regarding internet search engine safety codes, additionally noting the number of identified accounts as "over 80,000" by October 2025.

==== Collaboration with Schlep ====
Schlep's YouTube profile picture

Following similar videos published by YouTuber Schlep, who conducted independent sting operations against alleged child predators on the platform and investigated Roblox's platform moderation, Simon entered into a public partnership with him and began appearing in his videos. Schlep's content involved creating decoy accounts in order to lure individuals seeking to exploit minors. According to his legal representation, six arrests have been made in connection with evidence forwarded by him to local law enforcement.

In August 2025, Roblox Corporation permanently banned Schlep and issued a cease and desist order against him, updating its terms of service to prohibit unauthorized "vigilante groups", which the corporation argued "[bypassed] Roblox's own safety systems". Simon rejected the corporation's labeling of Schlep's actions as "vigilantism", arguing he'd simply documented evidence for police intervention.

== Reception ==
=== Media coverage ===
Media coverage of Simon's online activities largely began in November 2021 alongside the filing of Roblox Corporation v. Simon. Initial reporting by gaming and technology publications, such as The Verge, Polygon, and PC Gamer, focused heavily on the corporation's allegations of severe harassment and terms of service violations. During this coverage, journalists characterized Simon as an "internet troll" and a "cybermob" leader, owing to his history of circumventing platform bans and his posting of controversial content.

Following the 2022 settlement and his subsequent pivot to child safety advocacy, Simon's media reception shifted, with mainstream publications and legal representatives characterizing him as a "prominent critic" of Roblox Corporation, and as a creator focused on Roblox's alleged moderation problems, as well as "highlighting predatory behavior" on the platform.

=== Corporate response ===
Following Roblox Corporation v. Simon, both Roblox Corporation and Simon declined to further comment on the settlement, with Simon citing a confidentiality agreement. On July 22, 2024, a Bloomberg Businessweek article detailing the FBI arrest of Arnold Castillo was released. Simon served as a primary interviewee for the piece, with Roblox claiming in the article that Simon was not a "credible source of information about [Roblox's] strong safety record." The next day, a Roblox spokesperson responded to Eurogamer's coverage of the article, alleging Bloomberg's article "contained glaring mischaracterisations about how [Roblox] protect[s] users of all ages" and "failed to reflect ... the complexities of online child safety."

In August 2025, Roblox Corporation's legal stance towards critics of the platform's safety record drew renewed scrutiny from journalists and commentators after the company released a cease-and-desist letter to the YouTuber Schlep, along with terminating his accounts on the platform. The attorneys representing Schlep noted Roblox Corporation invoked the Computer Fraud and Abuse Act on the same basis as it had against Simon during Roblox Corporation v. Simon. Simon retained the same law firms as Schlep in connection with these events.
