= Michael Fitts =

American legal scholar

15th President of Tulane University
- Incumbent
- Assumed office July 1, 2014
- Preceded by: Scott Cowen

Personal details
- Born: March 1, 1953 (age 73)
- Education: Harvard University (BA); Yale University (JD)

Michael Andrew Fitts (born March 1, 1953) is an American legal scholar who has been serving as the 15th president of Tulane University in New Orleans, Louisiana, since July 2014. He previously served as dean of the University of Pennsylvania Law School from 2000 to 2014.

== Early life and education ==
Fitts grew up in the West Philadelphia section of Philadelphia, Pennsylvania. He received a Bachelor of Arts degree from Harvard University in 1975 and a Juris Doctor degree from Yale University in 1979. At Yale, he was an editor of the Yale Law Journal.

== Career ==
After law school, Fitts served from 1979 to 1981 as a law clerk to A. Leon Higginbotham Jr., a judge on the United States Court of Appeals for the Third Circuit. From 1981 to 1985, he was an attorney-adviser in the Office of Legal Counsel at the United States Department of Justice.

Fitts joined the University of Pennsylvania Law School faculty as an assistant professor in 1985. He was appointed as an associate professor in 1990, a full professor in 1992, and the Robert G. Fuller Jr. Professor of Law in 1996. His teaching and research included administrative law, election law, legislation, regulated industries, and relations among the presidency, Congress, and other governmental institutions.

=== University of Pennsylvania ===
Fitts became dean of the University of Pennsylvania Law School in 2000. During his first 13 years as law dean, the law school's endowment increased and it recruited about 20 new faculty members. Fitts remained law dean until 2014, when Tulane University selected him to succeed Scott Cowen as university president.

=== Tulane University ===
On February 4, 2014, Tulane University named Fitts the 15th president of the university, effective July 1.

==== Early decision policy ====
Under Fitts's presidency, Tulane introduced binding early decision admissions in 2016. By 2022, approximately two-thirds of the students in an entering class had applied through one of the university's two early-decision rounds, while only 106 students were admitted through regular decision for a freshman class of more than 1,800.

Higher-education policy specialists quoted by Inside Higher Ed argued in 2022 that extensive use of early decision could disadvantage lower-income applicants who needed to compare financial-aid offers. A Tulane spokesperson responded that the university had experienced increased applicant interest and described the entering class as its most selective and diverse to that point.

==== 2024 Gaza war protest ====
In April 2024, hundreds of pro-Palestinian protesters, including students from Tulane and neighboring Loyola University New Orleans, established an encampment near Tulane's campus. Protesters called for a ceasefire in the Israel–Hamas war, disclosure of the university's investments, and divestment from companies doing business with the Israeli government.

The university closed three buildings and moved some affected classes online, and the university police arrested six protestors on April 29. Fitts characterized the encampment as an unlawful protest and sent police to clear the encampment on May 1, with at least fourteen protestors being arrested. Fourteen protestors charged with misdemeanor found not guilty by the Orleans Parish Criminal District Court of Louisiana in September 2024.

==== Law school freedom of speech controversy ====
In June 2025, Kimberly Terrell, the director of community engagement at the Tulane Environmental Law Clinic at Tulane Law School, resigned and accused the Fitts administration of restricting her ability to speak publicly about research concerning pollution, public health, and racial disparities in Louisiana's petrochemical industry.

Emails obtained by the Associated Press showed that law dean Marcilynn Burke had told clinic personnel that president Fitts was concerned the clinic's work could reduce political and donor support for Tulane's proposed redevelopment of the former Charity Hospital. Burke also wrote that Fitts had questioned whether some of the clinic's research-based advocacy had moved into lobbying and how it related to the clinic's representation of clients.

Terrell said that she had been told Louisiana governor Jeff Landry threatened to veto state support for the redevelopment unless the university acted against the clinic. Landry's office denied making such a threat. Tulane declined to discuss personnel matters while stating that the university remained committed to academic freedom and the educational value of law clinics.

Preceded by Charles W. "Chuck" Mooney, Jr.; Acting Dean	Dean of the University of Pennsylvania Law School; 2000-2014	Succeeded by Wendell E. Pritchett; Interim Dean
