= Schlep =

Schlep may refer to:

- Schlep (word), a word of Yiddish origin
- Schlep car, a nickname for the Wonderbug in The Krofft Supershow
- The Great Schlep, a political video created by Sarah Silverman in support for Barack Obama
- Schlep (YouTuber), a YouTuber known for catching online predators, and subject of the Roblox–Schlep controversy
