= Perfectionist liberalism =

Concept in political philosophy

Perfectionist liberalism (also liberal perfectionism) has been defined by Charles Larmore (1987) as the "family of views that base political principles on 'ideals claiming to shape our overall conception of the good life, and not just our role as citizens.'" Joseph Raz popularised those ideas. Other important contemporary theorists of liberal perfectionism are George Sher and Steven Wall. One can also find liberal perfectionist strands of thought in the writings of nineteenth century liberals, such as John Stuart Mill and T. H. Green, and early twentieth century liberals such as L.T. Hobhouse and John Dewey.

== Overview ==
Perfectionist liberalism is the combination of two ideas: perfectionism and liberalism. What makes perfectionist liberalism perfectionist is its embracement of an objective theory of the good life (or of human well-being) and the belief that it is the business of the state to (sometimes) promote the good life of its citizens or (if a cosmopolitan theory of justice is correct) to promote the good life of all human beings. What makes perfectionist liberalism liberal is that it either holds a theory of the good life that gives pride of place to the value of autonomy or that it holds a theory of the good life from which classical liberal rights and/or the principle of state neutrality can be derived (contingently, yet over a wide range of "close" possible worlds), or both.

Often perfectionism is associated with paternalism. If the state is to promote the well-being of its citizens, so the reasoning, it also has to intervene with citizens' actions that are not conducive to their well-being. Most perfectionist liberals try to avoid this implication by showing that paternalist state action is self-defeating, i.e. they try to show that the best way for the state to promote the well-being of its citizens is to restrain itself and let each individual strive for her good by herself. Others bite the bullet and hold that liberalism is compatible with some amount of paternalism.

Among political philosophers, it is commonplace that perfectionist liberals derive political principles (that guide political action and the design of political institutions) from a theory of the good life. What is often missed is that a theory of political action is not derivable from a theory of the good life alone. Principles can only be derived from other principles. It is therefore of critical importance that liberal perfectionists commit themselves not only to a theory of the good life but also to a theory of distributive justice. Utilitarianism, Egalitarianism, Sufficientarianism and Prioritarianism are the standard candidates when it comes to principles of distribution.

For Raz, at the centre of his perfectionist liberalism are autonomy and moral pluralism and the approach can be contrasted with political liberalism. Martha Nussbaum (2011) notes that elsewhere Larmore (1997) argues that "these views involve controversial ideals of the good life, or views about 'the ultimate nature of the human good.'"

For Nussbaum, perfectionist liberalism "is a species of a genus of liberal views that might be called “comprehensive liberalisms”" as opposed to "political" or "public" liberalisms. All perfectionist liberalisms are therefore comprehensive while not all comprehensive liberalisms are perfectionist. An eminent case of a comprehensive, yet non-perfectionist liberal theory is Lockean libertarianism, which is built on the ideal of self-ownership rather than on a conception of the good life. For Nussbaum "liberalisms that base political principles on some comprehensive doctrine about human life" cover "not only the political domain but also the domain of human conduct generally". Furthermore, they depart from non-comprehensive (i.e. political or public reason) liberalism in grounding their political principles in a theory of the good (life), while the latter takes an allegedly "neutral" stance which is supposed to be compatible with all kinds of (reasonable) theories of the good (life).
