= Liz Murrill =

American politician (born 1963)

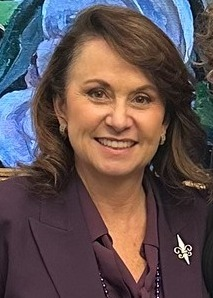
- Murrill in 2024

46th Attorney General of Louisiana
- Incumbent
- Assumed office January 8, 2024
- Governor: Jeff Landry
- Preceded by: Jeff Landry

Personal details
- Born: Elizabeth Baker; 1963 (age 62–63) New Orleans, Louisiana, U.S.
- Party: Republican
- Children: 4
- Education: Louisiana State University (BA, JD); Pepperdine University (LLM)
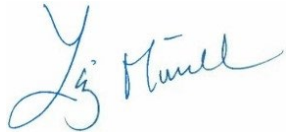
- Signature
- Website: Campaign website

Elizabeth Murrill (née Baker; born 1963) is an American politician and lawyer. A member of the Republican Party, she is serving as the 46th attorney general of Louisiana since January 2024. Prior to this, she served as solicitor general of Louisiana from 2015 to 2024.

== Early life and career ==
Murrill grew up in Lafayette, Louisiana. Her parents are Dr. Larry Eugene Baker, who served as the Chief of Staff at Lafayette General Hospital in Lafayette, Louisiana, and Helen Vaughan Burdin Simpson, who was a professor of History and Humanities and the Head of the Department of History and Geography at the University of Louisiana at Lafayette. Murrill attended Cathedral-Carmel School, as well as Lafayette High School in Lafayette, Louisiana.

She became a pledge of Delta Delta Delta sorority and earned a bachelor's degree in journalism from Louisiana State University in 1985, after which she worked at a newspaper in Florida. Murrill later attended the Paul M. Hebert Law Center, where she served as the editor-in-chief of the Louisiana Law Review and graduated in 1991.

Murrill served as a United States Supreme Court Fellow from 2007 to 2008 and earned a Master of Laws degree from Pepperdine University School of Law in 2010. She clerked for U.S. District Judge Frank J. Polozola and Louisiana First Circuit Court of Appeal Judge Melvin Shortress. She became solicitor general of Louisiana in 2015.

As solicitor general Murrill argued:

- Biden v. Missouri
- Edwards v. Vannoy
- June Medical Services LLC v. Russo
- Ramos v. Louisiana
- McCoy v. Louisiana

== Attorney General of Louisiana (2024–present) ==
In 2023, Jeff Landry, the attorney general of Louisiana, opted to run for governor of Louisiana instead of running for reelection. Murrill announced her candidacy to succeed him as attorney general in the 2023 election. Murrill finished in first place in the all-candidate primary election and advanced to a runoff election. In the runoff election on November 18, Murrill defeated Lindsey Cheek with 67% of the vote. She was the first woman to serve as attorney general in Louisiana.

=== Abortion ===
"At the request of Attorney General Liz Murrill" Governor Jeff Landry signed an extradition warrant for a New York Doctor accusing her of violating Louisiana's near-total abortion ban.

Murrill joined 14 other AG's "urging Congress to consider taking action preempting abortion shield laws".

=== Capital punishment ===
On September 3, 2025, Murrill announced that she would request the United States Supreme Court overturn Roper v. Simmons, a ruling which prohibited the death penalty for juvenile offenders, and reinstate the death sentence of a juvenile offender whose death sentence was previously vacated in the aftermath of Roper.

=== Citizenship and ICE ===
Murrill defended Executive Order 14160.

Murrill released a statement that "I will pursue all legal remedies against those who fail to uphold our laws and try to impede ICE agents".

=== Elections ===
Murrill joined a letter urging Congressional Leaders to support and pass the Safeguard American Voter Eligibility Act. Previously, Murrill joined an amicus brief in support of the RNC in Republican National Committee v. Mi Familia Vota.

=== Environment ===
Murrill's Office filed an amicus brief in Seven County Infrastructure Coalition v. Eagle County.

=== Israel ===
Murrill called to end taxpayer funding to the United Nations Relief and Works Agency (UNRWA). Murrill also sent a letter to Michigan AG Dana Nessel "encouraging her to stand strong amid all the outside groups and political actors criticizing her for charging individuals involved in the dangerous anti-Israel protests at the University of Michigan".

=== LGBTQ+ rights ===
Murrill joined an amicus brief in United States v. Skrmetti.

=== Religion ===
When House Bill 71, a law directing schools to display the Ten Commandments, was blocked by a district judge, Murrill said she plans to appeal the decision.

=== Roblox child protection ===
On August 14, 2025, Murrill sued the Roblox Corporation and filed a child protection lawsuit against them in the aftermath of the Schlep ban controversy.

=== Trump ===
On March 16, 2024, Murrill, along with 21 other state attorneys general, urged the U.S. Supreme Court to carefully consider Donald Trump's arguments as it weighs whether he is immune from prosecution for the January 6 United States Capitol attack.

=== 2026 criminal indictment ===
On July 2, 2026, an Orleans Parish grand jury indicted Murrill on 16 felony counts, consisting of eight counts of public intimidation and eight counts of malfeasance in office. The charges arose from letters she sent in May 2026 to New Orleans officials, including Mayor Helena Moreno, District Attorney Jason Williams, several city council members and retired judge Calvin Johnson, concerning a dispute over the Orleans Parish clerk of court position after state legislation abolished the separate criminal court clerk's office. Bond was set at $400,000, or $25,000 for each count.

Murrill denied wrongdoing and said the indictment was retaliatory and unconstitutional. Governor Jeff Landry criticized the indictment and said he would pardon Murrill "as fast as the law allows".

On July 3, 2026, the Louisiana Supreme Court stayed the proceedings, saying Murrill had made a "compelling argument" about alleged defects in the grand jury proceedings and the trial court's handling of the case. The court also cited possible conflicts involving special prosecutor Laurie White, including that White had previously represented Calvin Duncan and was being defended by Murrill's office in a separate lawsuit. In a later order the same day, the court recalled Murrill's arrest warrant and ordered it removed from law enforcement databases while the stay remained in effect.

Murrill's arraignment was postponed after the Orleans Parish Criminal District Court judges recused themselves from the case. On July 9, 2026, the Louisiana Supreme Court appointed retired judge Robert A. Chaisson to sit ad hoc in Orleans Parish Criminal District Court for the case.

== Personal life ==
Murrill and her husband have been married for over 30 years. They have four sons.

Party political offices
Preceded by Jeff Landry	Republican nominee for Attorney General of Louisiana; 2023	Most recent
Legal offices
Preceded by Jeff Landry	Attorney General of Louisiana; 2024–present	Incumbent
