= Abortion in Louisiana =

Abortion in Louisiana is illegal as of August 1, 2022.

In 2022, Governor John Bel Edwards signed a law criminalizing abortion providers. An earlier version of the bill had also sought to criminalize abortion seekers, but this was vehemently opposed by both opponents and advocates of abortion rights. In 2023, some lawmakers proposed adding exceptions for rape and incest, but these proposals were rejected. Louisiana is one of the most anti-abortion states in the country; with state residents approving a constitutional amendment banning legal recognition of the procedure in 2020.

In 2024, Governor Jeff Landry signed a bill that classifies the abortion-inducing drugs mifepristone and misoprostol as a Schedule IV controlled substance.

A 2022 LSU poll found that 49% thought abortion should be illegal in all or most cases, and 46% thought it should be legal. Among Democrats, the rate of support increased from 51% to 74% after a similar poll in 2016, while there was little change among Republicans. The 2023 American Values Atlas reported that, in their most recent survey, 53% of people from Louisiana said that abortion should be legal in all or most cases.

== History ==
=== Legislative history ===
By the end of the 1800s, Louisiana was the only state lacking a therapeutic exception in its legislative ban on abortions. In the 19th century, abortion bans by state legislatures centered on protecting the life of the mother given the number of deaths caused by abortions. State governments viewed themselves as looking out for the lives of their citizens.

A 1997 Louisiana law created a civil cause-of-action for abortion-related damages, including damage to the unborn child for up to ten years after the abortion. The same law also barred the state's Patient's Compensation Fund (which limits malpractice liability for participating physicians) from insuring against abortion-related claims. An attorney for the Center for Reproductive Rights, who opposes the law, stated that it is an attempt to drive abortion providers out of practice, and that every completed abortion imposes strict liability under the law because abortion necessarily involves damage to the unborn child.

On June 19, 2006, Kathleen Blanco signed a trigger ban on most forms of abortion, with the exception of threats to the life or permanent health of the mother. Although she supported exceptions for rape and incest, she stated that the exclusion was not sufficient grounds to veto the bill. The law would allow for the prosecution of any person who performed, or aided someone in performing, an abortion. It included penalties up to 10 years imprisonment and a fine of $100,000.

In the 2000s, Louisiana passed a law banning abortions after 22 weeks based on the belief that fetuses can feel pain at that point in a pregnancy. In 2007, Louisiana was one of 23 states to have a detailed abortion-specific informed-consent requirement. By law, abortion providers in Louisiana were required to perform an ultrasound on a pregnant woman prior to providing her with abortion services, despite the fact that it serves no medical purpose at that point of gestation.

In 2011, Louisiana became one of six states to introduce a bill (which failed to pass) banning abortion in almost all cases. In 2013, the state's Targeted Regulation of Abortion Providers (TRAP) law applied to private doctor offices in addition to abortion clinics. In 2014, the state passed a law that required it to maintain a database of women who had abortions in the state, and the type of abortion performed. A second law passed in 2014, Act 620, was modeled after an earlier Texas law requiring that any doctor performing abortions also have admittance privileges at an authorized hospital within a 30-mile radius of the abortion clinic, among other new requirements. At the time the law was passed, only one doctor met the required criteria, effectively leaving only one legal abortion clinic in the state. The state had a law on the books in August 2018 that would be triggered if Roe v. Wade was overturned.

One of the most active years (in terms of trying to pass abortion rights restrictions) for state legislatures across the nation was 2019. Many Republican-led states began to push these bills after Brett M. Kavanaugh was confirmed as a US Supreme Court judge (Kavanaugh replacing the more liberal Anthony M. Kennedy). These state governments generally saw Kavanaugh's confirmation as a positive efforts that moves to restrict abortion rights would less likely face resistance by the courts. In mid-May 2019, Louisiana state law banned abortion after week 22. Shortly thereafter, the Louisiana legislature passed making abortion illegal in almost all cases. Louisiana was one of several states passing similar laws in April and May 2019, alongside Georgia, Missouri, and Alabama. The bill was created as an amendment and required voters in the state to pass it via referendum before it could become law. The law was an example of a "fetal heartbeat" bill. At the time the bill passed, 15% of the state legislators were female, with only two female representatives voting against the bill.

In 2020, Louisiana voters passed a measure to amend the state constitution to omit any language implying that a woman has a right to get an abortion or that any abortion that does occur should be funded.

In May 2022, a state House committee voted 7–2 to advance a bill (HB813) that would open the possibility of a woman and her physician being charged with homicide for having an abortion at any point during gestation, and could also criminalize the destruction of embryos during IVF. The bill faced bipartisan opposition from lawmakers and some anti-abortion groups. The bill was ultimately amended to remove criminal penalties for abortion seekers, and was and signed into law by Governor John Bel Edwards.

In July 2022, the New Orleans City Council voted unanimously to not enforce the state's anti-abortion laws, effectively decriminalising abortion.

=== Judicial history ===
The US Supreme Court's decision in 1973's Roe v. Wade ruling meant the state could no longer regulate abortion in the first trimester.

The model Texas law passed in 2014 was declared unconstitutional by the Supreme Court in Whole Woman's Health v. Hellerstedt in 2016, as the additional admitting privileges required by Texas law interfered with a woman's right to an abortion per Roe v. Wade. While the Texas law was being challenged, the Louisiana law was challenged by abortion clinics and doctors in the state in June Medical Services, LLC v. Gee; while the District Court ordered an injunction on the law, the Fifth Circuit Court of Appeals reversed this decision, allowing the law to come in effect later in 2014. The plaintiffs petitioned the Supreme Court, which granted an emergency stay of the Fifth Circuit's order. The court was pending the result of the pending Texas litigation in Whole Woman's Health. June Medical Services was remanded back to District Court, which found the law to be unconstitutional under Whole Woman's Health. The Fifth Circuit reversed the District's finding and prepared to allow the law to be reintroduced by February 4, 2019, differentiating the case from the one in Texas as they found the physician had not taken any steps to try to qualify for this allowance. The plaintiffs again petitioned the Supreme Court for an emergency stay of the Fifth Circuit's decision. Justice Samuel Alito granted the stay of the law until February 7, 2019, stating that the Court needed more time to evaluate the request and had made no merits on the ruling of the case. On February 7, 2019, the Supreme Court ruled 5–4, with Justice John Roberts joining the liberal Justices, in reversing the Firth Circuit's order, effectively preventing the law from going into effect. The Supreme Court overturned Roe v. Wade in Dobbs v. Jackson Women's Health Organization, No. 19-1392, 597 U.S. ___ (2022) later in 2022 which returned the legislative decision to the individual states.

=== Clinic history ===
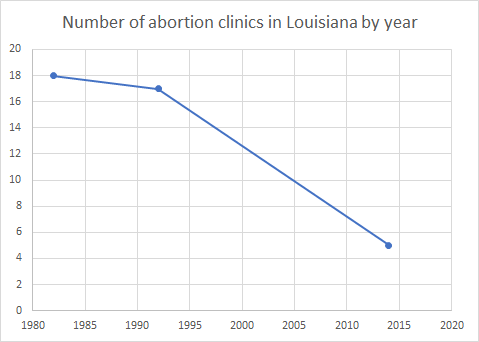
Number of abortion clinics in Louisiana by year

Between 1982 and 1992, the number of abortion clinics in Louisiana decreased by one, going from eighteen in 1982 to seventeen in 1992. In 2014, there were five abortion clinics in the state. In 2014, 92% of the parishes in the state lacked an abortion clinic, leaving 63% of women between the ages of 15 and 44 without access to an abortion clinic. In 2017, there were two Planned Parenthood clinics, neither of which offered abortion services, in Louisiana whose population of women aged 15–49 at the time was 1,089,684. As of July 21, 2017, Kentucky, Louisiana, Mississippi, North Dakota, West Virginia, and Wyoming were the only six states that did not have a Planned Parenthood clinic offering abortion services. In 2016, there were four abortion clinics in the state. By 2017, there were three abortion clinics left.

In 2022, the three remaining abortion clinics in Louisiana closed following the decision in Dobbs v. Jackson Women's Health Organization. The state now has no abortion clinics.

In 2025, Planned Parenthood Gulf Coast announced it would cease operations due to funding cuts. Consequently, it was forced to close two clinics in Texas and the two in Louisiana. The state had no Planned Parenthood clinics until a clinic reopened in 2026.

== Statistics ==
Between 1972 and 1974, Louisiana had an illegal-abortion mortality rate of 0.1-0.9 per million women aged 15–44. In 1990, 489,000 women in Louisiana faced the risk of unintended pregnancy. In 2001, Arizona, Florida, Iowa, Louisiana, Massachusetts, and Wisconsin did not provide any residence-related data regarding abortions performed in the state to the Centers for Disease Control. In 2010, the state had zero publicly funded abortions. In 2013, there were 290 abortions among white women aged 15–19, 640 abortions for black women aged 15–19, zero abortions for Hispanic women aged 15–19, and 60 abortions for women of all other races. In 2014, 57% of adults indicated (in a national poll by the Pew Research Center) that abortion should be illegal in all or most cases with only 39% saying it should be legal.

In March 2024, a report was released stating that in the wake of Louisiana's abortion ban, pregnant patients had been given risky, unnecessary surgeries and C-sections, denied swift treatment for miscarriages, were forced to delay routine prenatal care until after 12 weeks of pregnancy, and were forced to wait until their life was at risk before getting an abortion.

Number of reported abortions, abortion rate and percentage change in rate by geographic region and state in 1992, 1995 and 1996
| Census division and state | Number | | | Rate | | | % change 1992–1996 |
|---|---|---|---|---|---|---|---|
| Census division and state | 1992 | 1995 | 1996 | 1992 | 1995 | 1996 | % change 1992–1996 |
| US Total | 1,528,930 | 1,363,690 | 1,365,730 | 25.9 | 22.9 | 22.9 | –12 |
| West South Central | 127,070 | 119,200 | 120,610 | 19.6 | 18 | 18.1 | –8 |
| Arkansas | 7,130 | 6,010 | 6,200 | 13.5 | 11.1 | 11.4 | –15 |
| Louisiana | 13,600 | 14,820 | 14,740 | 13.4 | 14.7 | 14.7 | 10 |
| Oklahoma | 8,940 | 9,130 | 8,400 | 12.5 | 12.9 | 11.8 | –5 |
| Texas | 97,400 | 89,240 | 91,270 | 23.1 | 20.5 | 20.7 | –10 |

Number, rate, and ratio of reported abortions, by reporting area of residence and occurrence and by percentage of abortions obtained by out-of-state residents, US CDC estimates
| Location | Residence | | | Occurrence | | | % obtained by out-of-state residents | Year | Ref |
|---|---|---|---|---|---|---|---|---|---|
| Location | No. | Rate^ | Ratio^^ | No. | Rate^ | Ratio^^ | % obtained by out-of-state residents | Year | Ref |
| Louisiana | | | | 13,600 | 13.4 | | | 1992 | |
| Louisiana | | | | 14,820 | 14.7 | | | 1995 | |
| Louisiana | | | | 14,740 | 14.7 | | | 1996 | |
| Louisiana | 9,416 | 10.0 | 146 | 10,322 | 10.9 | 160 | 14.1 | 2014 | |
| Louisiana | 8,515 | 9 | 132 | 9,362 | 9.9 | 145 | 14.6 | 2015 | |
| Louisiana | 8,243 | 8.8 | 130 | 8.973 | 9.5 | 142 | 15.4 | 2016 | |
^number of abortions per 1,000 women aged 15–44; ^^number of abortions per 1,000 live births

== Abortion rights views and activities ==
=== Protests ===
Louisiana women participated in marches supporting abortion rights as part of a #StoptheBans movement in May 2019.

Following the overturn of Roe v. Wade on June 24, 2022, hundreds of abortion rights protesters gathered in New Orleans, marching from Lafayette Square to City Hall. On June 30, abortion rights protesters rallied at the Louisiana State Capitol in Baton Rouge before marching to the governor's mansion.

== Anti-abortion views and activities ==
=== Violence ===
On December 18, 1996, Calvin Jackson, a medical doctor of New Orleans, Louisiana was stabbed 15 times, losing 4 pints of blood. Donald Cooper was charged with second degree attempted murder and was sentenced to 20 years in prison.

On December 12, 2005, Patricia Hughes and Jeremy Dunahoe threw a Molotov cocktail at a clinic in Shreveport, Louisiana. The device missed the building and no damage was caused. In August 2006, Hughes was sentenced to six years in prison, and Dunahoe to one year. Hughes claimed the bomb was a "memorial lamp" for an abortion she had had there.
