= Abortion in Washington (state) =

Abortion in Washington is legal and available up to the point of fetal viability, or in case the pregnancy poses a risk to life or health. In a 2014 poll by the Pew Research Center, 60% of adults said that abortion should be legal in all or most cases. The 2023 American Values Atlas reported that, in their most recent survey, 73% of Washingtonians said that abortion should be legal in all or most cases.

Washington currently has nineteen abortion clinics. The number of clinics has declined over the years, with 95 in 1982, 65 in 1992, and 33 in 2014. There were 17,710 legal abortions performed in the state in 2014 and 17,098 in 2015.

== History ==
=== Legislative history ===
By 1950, the state legislature passed a law stating that a woman who had an abortion or actively sought to have an abortion, regardless of whether she went through with it, was guilty of a criminal offense.

Abortion was made legal in 1970. Prior to that, it was illegal in the state, with a therapeutic exception if the life of the mother was at risk. In 1971, the state repealed its statute that said inducing an abortion was a criminal offense. Hawaii, New York, Alaska, and Washington were the first states to repeal their abortion laws in the pre-Roe v. Wade era. Still, state law in 1971 required that any woman getting a legal abortion in the state needed to be a resident for some specific period between 30 and 90 days.

As of 2017, Washington State, New Mexico, Illinois, Alaska, Maryland, Massachusetts, Connecticut, and New Jersey allowed certain qualified non-physicians to prescribe drugs for medical abortions only. In August 2018, the state had a law to protect the right to have an abortion. In February 2019, the Washington State Attorney General issued an opinion that the physician-only clause of Washington State abortion law (I-120) was unenforceable and that aspiration and medication abortion prior to viability was within the scope of nurse practitioners and physician assistants. As of 2024, the state prohibits abortions after the fetus is viable, generally some point between week 24 and 28, unless the pregnancy poses a risk to life or health. This period uses a standard defined by the US Supreme Court in 1973 with the Roe v. Wade ruling.

=== Ballot box history ===
In November 1970, Washington held a referendum on legalizing early pregnancy abortions, becoming the first state to legalize abortion through a vote of the people. In 1991, a ballot box measure passed that made abortion legal up to the point where a fetus was viable.

=== Clinic history ===
Between 1982 and 1992, the number of abortion clinics in the state declined by thirty, going from 95 in 1982 to 65 in 1992. In 2014, there were 33 abortion clinics in the state. In 2014, 64% of the counties in the state did not have an abortion clinic. That year, 15% of women in the state aged 15–44 lived in a county without an abortion clinic. In March 2016, there were 35 Planned Parenthood clinics in the state. In 2017, there were 34 Planned Parenthood clinics, of which 26 offered abortion services, in a state with a population of 1,645,293 women aged 15–49.

On June 11, 2001, an unsolved bombing took place at a clinic in Tacoma, Washington, destroying a wall and resulting in $6,000 in damages. On September 4, 2015, a Planned Parenthood clinic in Pullman, Washington was intentionally set on fire. No injuries were reported due to the time of day, but the FBI was involved because of a history of domestic terrorism against the clinic. The crime was never solved and the clinic reopened six months later.

== Statistics ==
In 1990, 606,000 women in the state faced the risk of an unintended pregnancy. In 2014, 60% of adults said in a poll by the Pew Research Center that abortion should be legal in all or most cases. In 2017, the state had an infant mortality rate of 3.9 deaths per 1,000 live births.

Number of reported abortions, abortion rate, and percentage change in rate by geographic region and state in 1992, 1995 and 1996
Census division and state	Number			Rate			% change 1992–1996
Census division and state	1992	1995	1996	1992	1995	1996	% change 1992–1996
US total	1,528,930	1,363,690	1,365,730	25.9	22.9	22.9	–12
Pacific	368,040	290,520	288,190	38.7	30.5	30.1	–22
Alaska	2,370	1,990	2,040	16.5	14.2	14.6	–11
California	304,230	240,240	237,830	42.1	33.4	33	–22
Hawaii	12,190	7,510	6,930	46	29.3	27.3	–41
Oregon	16,060	15,590	15,050	23.9	22.6	21.6	–10
Washington	33,190	25,190	26,340	27.7	20.2	20.9	–24

Number, rate, and ratio of reported abortions, by reporting area of residence and occurrence and by percentage of abortions obtained by out-of-state residents, US CDC estimates
Location	Residence			Occurrence			% obtained by out-of-state residents	Year	Ref
Location	No.	Rate^	Ratio^^	No.	Rate^	Ratio^^	% obtained by out-of-state residents	Year	Ref
Washington	17,583	12.6	198	17,710	12.7	200	4.9	2014	
Washington	17,230	12.2	194	17,098	12.1	192	4.5	2015	
Washington	17,140	11.9	189	17,080	11.9	189	3.8	2016	
^number of abortions per 1,000 women aged 15–44; ^^number of abortions per 1,000 live births

== Abortion financing ==
Seventeen states, including Washington, use their own funds to cover all or most "medically necessary" abortions sought by low-income women under Medicaid, thirteen of which are required by State court orders to do so. In 2010, the state had 14,236 publicly funded abortions, none of which were federally funded.

== Abortion rights views and activities ==
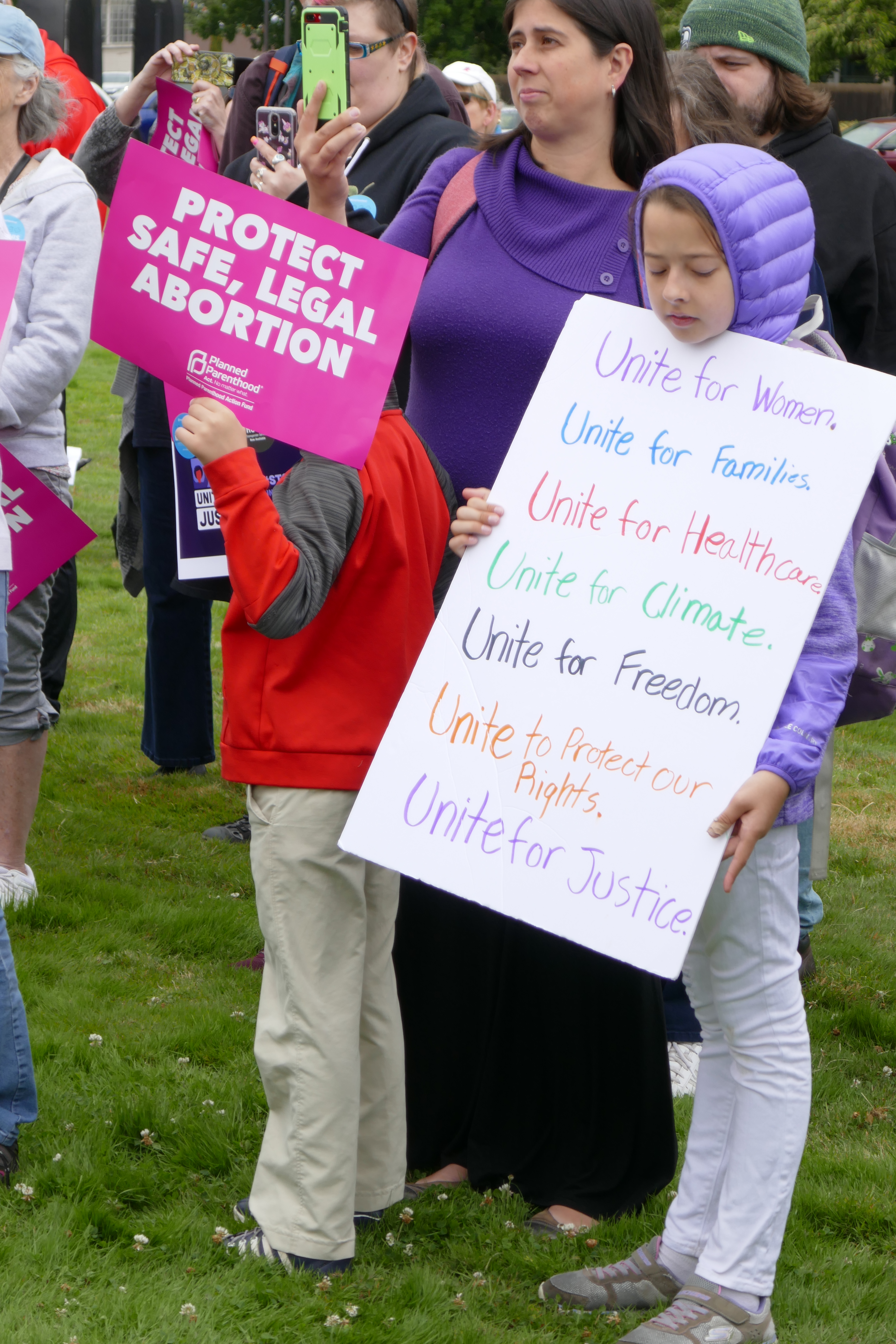
2018 Indivisible demonstration in Olympia regarding Brett Kavanaugh

Women from the state participated in marches supporting abortion rights as part of a #StoptheBans movement in May 2019.

Following the overturn of Roe v. Wade on June 24, 2022, thousands of abortion rights protesters protested in Spokane and Downtown Seattle.

On November 8 and 9, 2024, hundreds attended anti-Trump rallies in Seattle and Portland, Oregon.

== Anti-abortion views and activities ==
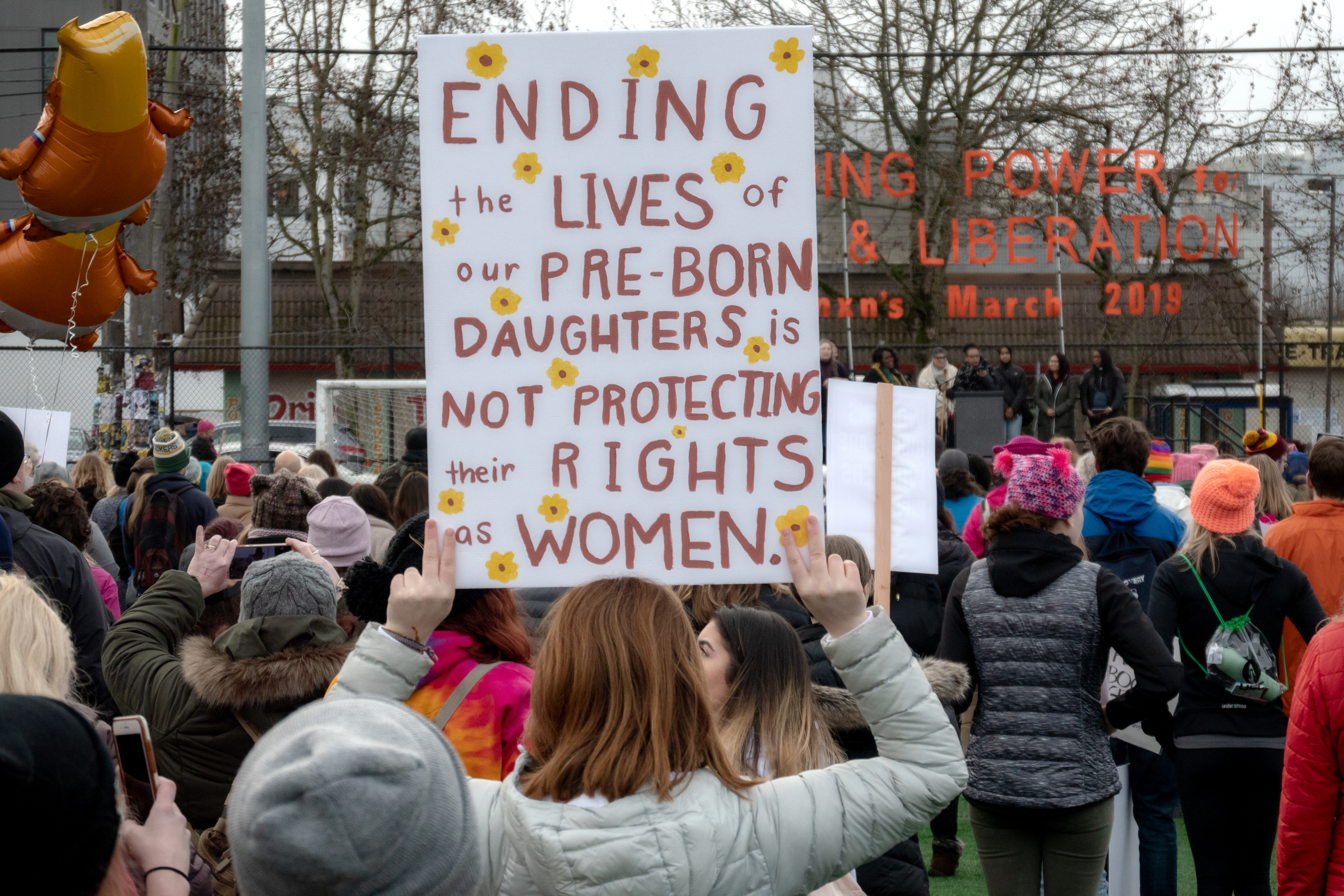
Seattle Women's March 2019

=== Violence ===
In 1983, two documented arson attacks on abortion clinics took place in Washington and Virginia, causing over US$500,000 in damage.

On June 11, 2001, an unsolved bombing at a clinic in Tacoma, Washington destroyed a wall, resulting in $6,000 in damages.

On January 9, 2005, Eastside Women's Clinic in Olympia, Washington sustained $500,000 in arson damages.

On September 4, 2015, a Planned Parenthood clinic in Pullman, Washington was intentionally set on fire. No injuries were reported due to the time of day, but the FBI was involved because of a history of domestic terrorism against the clinic. The crime was never solved and the clinic reopened six months later.
