= Schlep (YouTuber) =

American YouTuber (born 2003)

- Schlep testifying to the U.S. Senate, 2026
- Born: August 3, 2003 (age 23); Texas, United States
- Years active: 2023–present

YouTube information
- Channel: @RealSchlep
- Subscribers: 1.6 million (main channel); 1.9 million (combined) (Note: Subscribers, broken down by channel: 1.6 million (Schlep); 156 thousand (Maliboomer); 157 thousand (Schlepington))
- Views: 66.8 million (main channel); 109.4 million (combined) (Note: Views, broken down by channel: 66.8 million (Schlep); 29.7 million (Maliboomer); 12.9 million (Schlepington))
- Website: schlep.tv

Michael (born August 3, 2003), known online as Schlep, is an American YouTuber. He is known for catching alleged online predators on Roblox, which has resulted in six arrests. He was removed from the platform and was sent a cease-and-desist letter from the company on August 9, 2025, due to the content he was making. His termination by Roblox was met with major backlash from many online communities worldwide. In 2025, Chris Hansen, the host of the Dateline NBC television series To Catch a Predator, has reached out to Michael to make an upcoming documentary about child safety on Roblox.

== Personal life ==
Michael lives in Texas. Between the ages of twelve and fifteen, he was allegedly groomed by a prominent Roblox developer, during which the individual reportedly sent him graphic material and engaged in inappropriate conversations. Following these events, Michael attempted suicide. His mother later stated that Roblox was unresponsive to her inquiries until she threatened legal action.

== YouTube career ==
Schlep's YouTube profile picture

Under the Schlep channel, Michael became known for videos in which he posed as underage players to identify and confront suspected predators within Roblox. These stings were often recorded and then uploaded to YouTube, sometimes in collaboration with groups such as Predator Poachers or individual creators active in similar investigations.

Prior to his investigations of suspected predators, Schlep's older videos criticized Roblox and highlighted inappropriate games on the platform. He also had a YouTube account titled Maliboomer, where he made videos on the sandbox theme park simulator Theme Park Tycoon 2. After regularly getting complaints from his fans about sexual predators on Roblox, Schlep began investigating the platform, leading him to collaborate with YouTuber JiDion. Schlep identified himself as a "predator hunter". With his team, he created decoy accounts on Roblox that claimed to be minors to lure sexual predators, who engaged in explicit messaging with the decoys before agreeing to meet in person. The team let predators send unprompted incriminating messages to the decoys before showing the message to police as evidence. Of the six arrests, one did not result in charges. In one sting operation, a 21-year-old man was arrested after arranging an in-person meeting with a decoy he met on Roblox and communicated with for two months. Schlep has also openly criticized the platform on X for its failure to ban dangerous users from the platform.

Schlep's activities included coordination with local police and collaboration with groups such as "EDP Watch", founded by JiDion, and "Predator Poachers", led by Alex Rosen. Schlep claimed to have worked with Arkansas Police and NCMEC, although the police have never made any announcements about his operations. In an interview with Rolling Stone, Schlep said that he always wanted to collaborate with Roblox to solve the problem of child safety, but because of what he described as the platform's faulty moderation and report system, he stopped trusting them and decided to take matters into his own hands.

== Cease-and-desist and ban from Roblox ==
External videos
- Roblox Is Threatening to Sue Me For Protecting Kids

On August 9, 2025, a video titled "Roblox Is Threatening to Sue Me For Protecting Kids" was uploaded on Schlep's YouTube channel, where he explained that the Roblox Corporation had sent a cease-and-desist letter to him, as well as terminating all accounts associated with him and his group. Chris Hansen reportedly contacted Michael to discuss an upcoming documentary about Roblox's handling of child safety.

The company's actions were met with major backlash from many online communities, who viewed Schlep's actions as a necessary form of community policing. The situation escalated significantly days later and included calls for the CEO to resign and a petition by U.S. representative Ro Khanna.

On August 14, Louisiana Attorney General Liz Murrill filed a child protection lawsuit against Roblox Corporation. The suit alleged that by actively shutting down independent efforts to expose potential dangers on its platform, Roblox was failing in its duty to protect underage users from harm. Roblox has since responded to the lawsuit. On November 18, 2026, Schlep testified in Congress about how Roblox stated that it values paying out investors over the safety of its users.
