= 2019 Louisiana Attorney General election =

- October 12, 2019
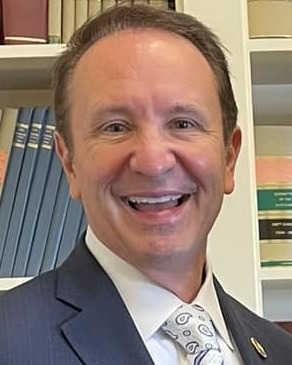

| Nominee | Jeff Landry | Ike Jackson |
| Party | Republican | Democratic |
| Popular vote | 855,338 | 436,531 |
| Percentage | 66.21% | 33.79% |
- Landry: 50–60% 60–70% 70–80% 80–90% >90% Jackson: 50–60% 60–70% 70–80% 80–90% >90% Tie: 50% No votes
Attorney General before election
Jeff Landry
Republican
Elected Attorney General
Jeff Landry
Republican

The 2019 Louisiana Attorney General election took place on October 12, 2019, to elect the Attorney General of the U.S. state of Louisiana, with a runoff election, held on November 16, 2019. Incumbent Republican Attorney General Jeff Landry successfully ran for a second term.

Under Louisiana's jungle primary system, all candidates appeared on the same ballot, regardless of party affiliation; voters could vote for any candidate, regardless of their own party affiliation.

== Candidates ==
=== Republican Party ===
==== Declared ====
- Jeff Landry, incumbent Attorney General of Louisiana

=== Democratic Party ===
==== Declared ====
- Ike Jackson, business attorney and former general counsel on the Louisiana Department of Natural Resources

== General election ==
=== Results ===
State Senate district results

Louisiana Attorney General election, 2019
| Party | Candidate | Votes | % | ±% |
|---|---|---|---|---|
| Republican | Jeff Landry (incumbent) | 855,338 | 66.21% | N/A |
| Democratic | Ike Jackson | 436,531 | 33.79% | N/A |
| Total votes | | 1,291,869 | 100% | N/A |
| Republican hold | | | | |

==== By congressional district ====
Landry won five of six congressional districts.

| District | Landry | Jackson | Representative |
|---|---|---|---|
| 1st | 76% | 24% | Steve Scalise |
| 2nd | 30% | 70% | Cedric Richmond |
| 3rd | 75% | 25% | Clay Higgins |
| 4th | 70% | 30% | Mike Johnson |
| 5th | 72% | 28% | Ralph Abraham |
| 6th | 70% | 30% | Garret Graves |
