= Roblox–Schlep controversy =

2025 internet controversy

Schlep in 2026

On August 9, 2025, Schlep, a Roblox-focused YouTuber known for conducting sting operations against sexual predators, was permanently banned from Roblox due to his alleged violations of terms of service. The Roblox Corporation sent him a cease and desist letter, threatening to take legal action against him if he resumed his activities. The ban gained traction with the media and generated controversy in the Roblox community, with increased criticism towards Roblox's child safety policies. U.S. Congressman Ro Khanna contacted Schlep and created a petition, with a goal of one million signatures that urged Roblox to "do more" to protect children.

On August 15, Schlep announced his intentions to countersue Roblox and that he had hired lawyers to fight its accusations. Roblox made a statement, justifying the ban. It claimed that vigilante groups moved users off-site to participate in sexual conversations and that they normalized such behavior on the platform. The controversy has led attorney general Liz Murrill of Louisiana to file a lawsuit against Roblox over child safety concerns.

== Background ==
Schlep, whose real name is Michael (born August 3, 2003), is a Texas-based YouTuber primarily known for Roblox-related content. He gained attention for organizing sting operations against sexual predators using Roblox to target minors, resulting in six arrests that were documented in videos on his channel. Schlep stated that he began playing Roblox at the age of twelve, where he was subjected to sexual grooming on the platform by a developer, further claiming that a report filed by his mother did not result in administrative action. He has attributed this experience, along with a subsequent suicide attempt, as motivation for his later efforts.

== Controversy ==
=== Cease and desist letter ===
On August 9, 2025, Schlep made a post on Twitter that included a photo of a cease and desist notice that he received from Roblox. The company said that he violated Roblox policies, specifically its new "vigilante groups" rule, and that he "actively interferes" with their protocols and should have reported inappropriate conduct to "official channels". They threatened to take legal action against him if he continued his activities or attempted to access Roblox. The letter also said that he violated user privacy guidelines by participating in "unauthorized and harmful activities" to users. Roblox terminated all of Schlep's accounts from the platform and prohibited him from creating new ones. Schlep also said that Roblox CEO David Baszucki blocked him on X (formerly Twitter).

External videos
- Roblox Is Threatening to Sue Me For Protecting Kids

On the same day, Schlep uploaded an 8-minute video to his YouTube channel, titled "Roblox Is Threatening to Sue Me For Protecting Kids", in which he detailed his termination from the platform and criticized Roblox. Schlep said that he was groomed in his youth on Roblox by an unnamed "popular developer", who made him watch gore videos and sexually explicit content and manipulated him into performing inappropriate acts. He also said that he and his team were thanked by police for catching predators on Roblox. Schlep added that he was disappointed with the termination of his accounts, and that it was the first time he was directly contacted by the platform. Schlep called the claims in the cease-and-desist letter "laughably hilarious". He added that he will never access Roblox again unless he is allowed to by the platform, and that he will continue his operations against predators on his website.

=== Reactions ===
External videos
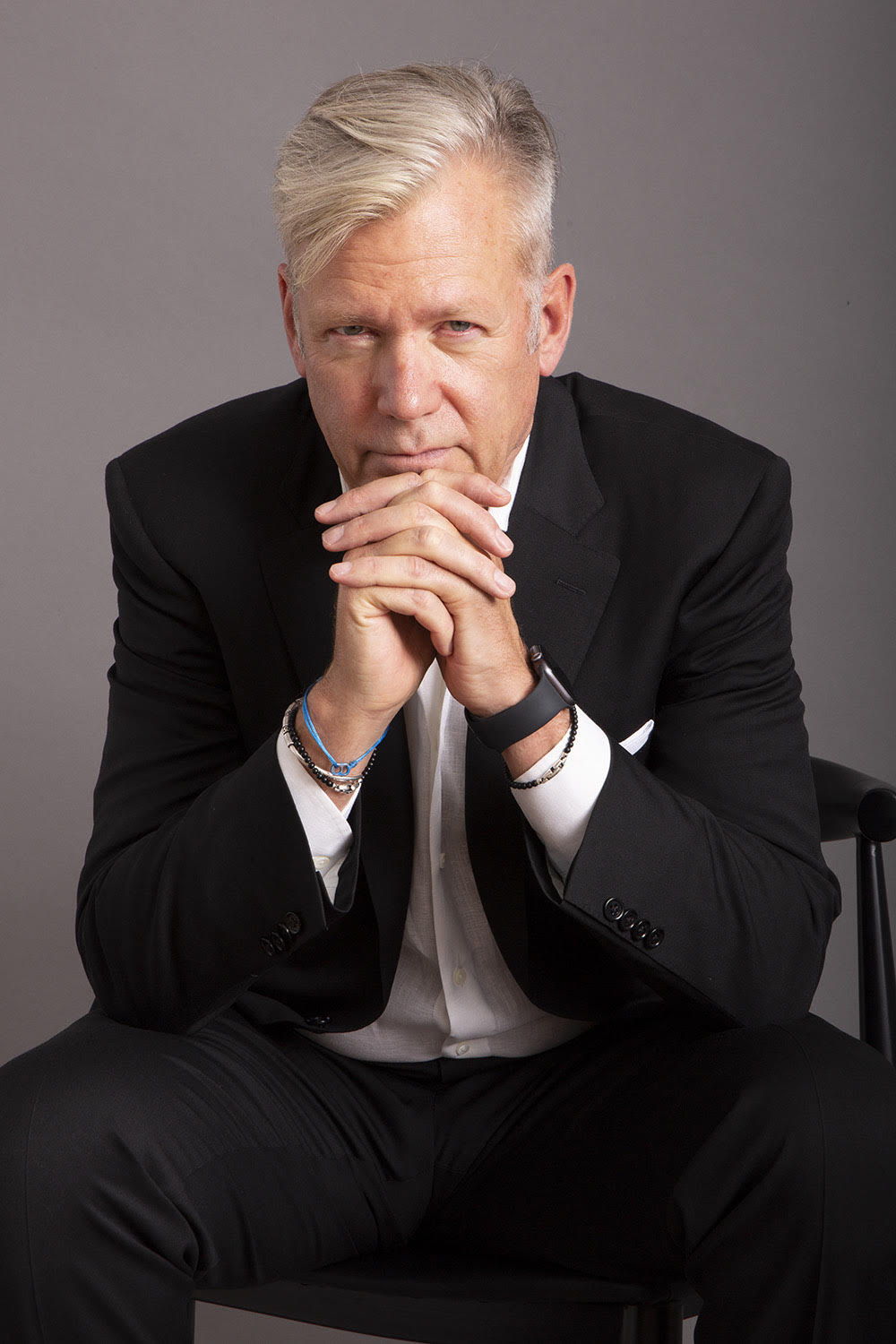
- Chris Hansen, known for the television show To Catch a Predator, was featured in a YouTube video from Schlep on August 22, where they discussed the future documentary and child safety on Roblox.
- Roblox, Take a Seat (ft: Chris Hansen)

The incident quickly gained traction, with the Roblox community voicing significant backlash to Schlep's ban and accusing Roblox of not caring about child safety. Shortly after the event, the hashtag "#freeschlep" became popular on X for several days, with users praising his actions. Some popular content creators, like Kindly Keyin and ThinkNoodles, quit Roblox's content program as a protest. Popular YouTubers like MoistCr1tikal, JiDion, and KreekCraft denounced Roblox's actions as "backwards" and "hypocritical". Ruben Sim, a YouTuber who was similarly banned and sued by Roblox after investigating child predators on the platforms, also showed his support. Some Roblox third-party developers intended to change icons and thumbnails of their games to read "FREE SCHLEP". Multiple players set their Roblox display name to "FREESCHLEP" and staged in-game protests, chanting "Free Schlep" in the chat. An online streamer known as Steak, with 3 million followers, staged a live protest at the Utah Capitol, holding signs that read "Free Schlep" for tens of thousands of online viewers.

Major media outlets reported on the controversy and scheduled national interviews. American television journalist Chris Hansen, known for the television show To Catch a Predator, released a documentary film titled Dangerous Games: Investigating Roblox — A Chris Hansen Special on February 27, 2026, which featured interviews with law enforcement, abuse victims, and Schlep. Hansen was also previously featured in a YouTube video from Schlep on August 22, 2025, where they discussed the future documentary and child safety on Roblox. Schlep reached out to Senator Ted Cruz by email and asked him to take action against Roblox. Representative Ro Khanna contacted Schlep and announced a petition on his website that demanded Roblox update its child safety policies to be more effective. On August 19, Ro Khanna announced on TikTok that his petition received nearly 100,000 signatures.

After the backlash, the Roblox Corporation released a statement on their decision to ban vigilante groups, reasoning that vigilante groups normalized inappropriate conduct on Roblox by impersonating minors and moving users off-site to participate in sexual conversations. It also said that vigilantes posing as minors is dangerous to the platform and makes them equivalent to predators. In a statement to Rolling Stone, the company shared quotes from police, attorneys, and academics describing how vigilante groups can interfere with official investigations and undermine criminal proceedings. Matt Kaufman, head of Roblox security, made a video on August 16 addressing the growing concerns, saying that Schlep's actions represented "vigilantism". Schlep denied the company's portrayal of him as a vigilante, saying he has not "taken the law into his own hands".

On September 5, 2025, Roblox CEO David Baszucki was interviewed by a CNBC journalist about child safety on Roblox and the Schlep ban controversy. Baszucki stated he plans to add new child safety measures and contacted Schlep for feedback, saying he "would love" his help in maintaining the platform's security. Schlep called Baszucki's comments a "PR stunt"; his legal team warned Roblox that this statement is "inappropriate" because of it ignoring Schlep's past attempts to communicate with its employees. In November 2025, Schlep posted a 36-minute video in which he claimed Roblox's head of security, Matt Kaufman, contacted him and offered to discuss the ban and ways that can "keep him active in the Roblox community". Schlep described the outreach as a "self-serving PR move that came only after public backlash". He also said his legal team sent Roblox a letter calling the outreach "improper" but saying they are "open to dialogue". Roblox reportedly did not reply.

=== Legal action ===
Schlep testifying in the United States Senate, November 17, 2026

On August 15, 2025, Schlep announced that he had hired lawyers with the intention to countersue Roblox. Stinar Gould Grieco & Hensley, the law firm that represents Schlep, stated that Roblox's policies have enabled child predators, [(aka "Bad Actors")] adding that they represent over 500 clients with similar stories of abuse. Steven Vanderporten, one of the lawyers, stated that Roblox's decision to ban Schlep suggests their carelessness about child safety and the suppression of criticism. He also stated that inappropriate games on Roblox have existed for almost 20 years, and that Roblox did nothing about them and used them to make profit. Mike Mandell, a lawyer and creator of the YouTube channel "Law by Mike", with over 14 million subscribers, announced his partnership with the legal team representing Schlep on September 1 to sue Roblox. Schlep confirmed his legal team's partnership with the YouTuber, adding that he had not filed a lawsuit yet due to being focused on "raising awareness about the dangers of Roblox".

In August 2025, Louisiana attorney general Liz Murrill sued Roblox due to an alleged lack of child safety, calling the platform a "perfect place for pedophiles"; the lawsuit was reportedly made in relation to the controversy. In October 2025, attorney and politician Russell Coleman announced a lawsuit against Roblox over child safety concerns. In his statement, Coleman mentioned Schlep, and stated that "Roblox is even trying to silence those who raised these security risks. The famous case of one of their developers, Schlep, immediately comes to mind".

On November 17, 2026, Schlep, along with other abuse victims, testified in the United States Senate, leading to discussion about the Kids Online Safety Act and disallowing forced arbitration.

== See also ==
- Censorship of Roblox
- Perverted-Justice
