= Marcilynn Burke =

American legal scholar

Marcilynn Burke is an American legal scholar. She was formerly Dean of the University of Oregon Law School from 2017 to 2024, and has been appointed Dean of the Tulane University Law School, effective August 5, 2024. She is also the chair of the board of trustees for the Law School Admissions Council.

In 2002, she joined the faculty of the University of Houston Law School, where she taught until 2017. Her service there was interrupted while she served from 2009 to 2013 during President Barack Obama's first term at the United States Department of the Interior in various roles, including acting assistant secretary.

Burke's undergraduate degree is from the University of North Carolina at Chapel Hill, and her Juris Doctor is from Yale University in New Haven, Connecticut. At Yale, she served as an editor of the Yale Journal of International Law and the Yale Journal of Law and Feminism.
