= Therapeutic privilege =

Information control procedure

Therapeutic privilege refers to the decision of a healthcare practitioner to withhold information from a patient when there is a justified belief that disclosure may cause serious mental or physical harm to them. As of 2022, this defence is permissible in countries such as Australia, Canada, England, Netherlands and Wales as an exception to the standard consent process. Despite this, there are very limited cases in which therapeutic privilege has been upheld. This is mainly due to the complex ethical and legal ramifications in withholding information from a patient and how to define someone as being at sufficient risk to fall into this category wherein therapeutic privilege should prevail. Another challenge in enacting therapeutic privilege is the consideration of other professionals involved in patient care, such as where there is a multidisciplinary care team. However, in withholding information, there is also a denial of patient autonomy

Therapeutic privilege is an exception to the general rule of informed consent, and only applies when disclosure of the information itself could pose serious and immediate harm to the patient, such as prompting suicidal behavior. The current AMA Code of Medical Ethics rejects therapeutic privilege as a defence. It states: "Except in emergency situations in which a patient is incapable of making an informed decision, withholding information without the patient’s knowledge or consent is ethically unacceptable."

Callahan Klaver states:

Some state laws severely restrict access to mental health records. Some require attending physicians to document in the record that they believe that access to the information contained in the medical record would harm their patients. Under the HIPAA privacy rule, if a licensed health care professional has determined, in the exercise of professional judgement, that the access requested is reasonably likely to endanger the life or physical safety of the individual or another person, the facility may then refuse such a request; however, this is a reviewable decision that affords the patient an appeal option.

== Legal and ethical considerations ==
In a doctor's role to act in the best interest of patients and to do no harm, the defense of therapeutic privilege validates non-disclosure of information, where disclosure may result in harm to the patient. However, non-disclosure of patient's diagnosis especially on file prevents other health professionals from working off accurate medical histories. Whilst there is ongoing concern on the conflict between medical paternalism and patient autonomy, it is argued that ‘the idea of a fully autonomous patient making choices completely independent of the doctor’s input does not reflect the complex reality of medical decision making’. Therapeutic privilege can be distinguished from scenarios where a patient has specifically requested to not be informed by the practitioner of information. Generally, 4 types of harm have been identified which may be causation to consider therapeutic privilege as discussed by Mulheron who states’ (i) some mental or psychological harm to the patient (falling short of a recognized psychiatric injury); (ii) some physical harm to the patient; (iii) the patient deciding to forego some treatment being recommended by the doctor; or (iv) some combination of these ‘harms’’. Maclean discusses the significant challenge in creating a boundary between autonomy and patient benefit, writing that ‘although the obligation to benefit the patient seems intuitively a good thing, it is important to determine the limits of the duty and consider how it interacts with the obligation to respect autonomy’. Another ethical challenge of therapeutic privilege which is discussed by Finnerty, is the question of who is qualified to judge the effect of non-disclosure on a patient which is critical consideration for a decision, ‘Insofar as it could be, what was clear from the case law was that it is the medical professional’s judgement of the effect of disclosure on the patient that is relevant. What is unclear is the qualification or training that would underpin such a judgment, which is clearly not medical in nature.’. Further, there is ambiguity surrounding therapeutic privilege as it is difficult to define patient harm objectively as well as how therapeutic privilege extends to the rest of a medical or care team of the patient.

In a more liberal approach, practitioners may endorse therapeutic privilege in line with the belief that disclosing every detail of their condition may detract from a more valuable use of time, such as disclosing the number of metastases in a critically ill cancer patient, rather than discussing symptom management or family struggles. This was discussed in the Court of Appeals of California in 1957 where Bray states that one needs to “recognize that each patient presents a separate problem, that the patient’s mental and emotional condition is important ... and that in discussing the element of risk a certain amount of discretion must be employed consistent with the full disclosure of facts necessary to an informed consent”. Moreover, some argue that overload of information may hinder a patient's ability to make a decision with clarity.

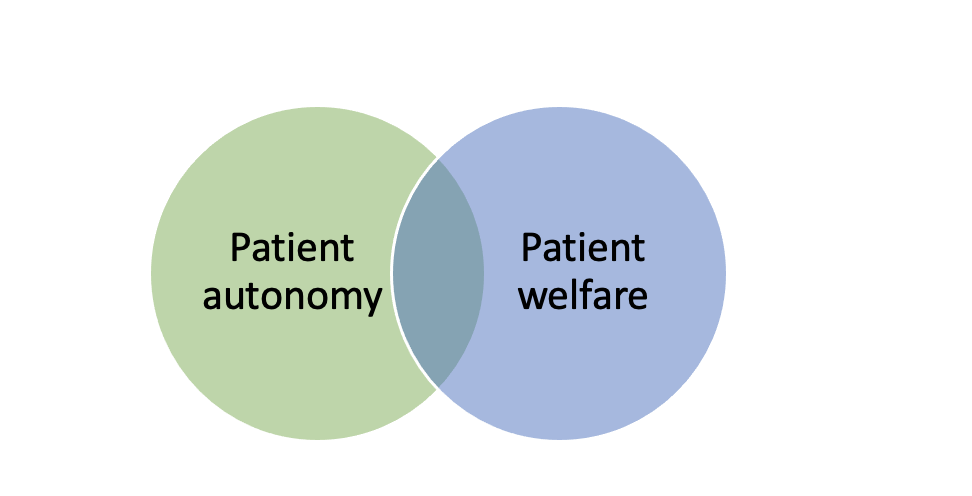
Therapeutic Privilege Venn Diagram

== Psychiatry and psychology ==
Therapeutic privilege is commonly discussed in the context of psychiatry. Despite a widespread concern of the ethical and legal validity of therapeutic privilege, it continues to be used by behavioural healthcare professionals. The American Medical Association states that ‘Information may be conveyed over time in keeping with the patient’s preferences and ability to comprehend the information.’. At the same time, it outlines that ‘Withholding pertinent medical information from patients in the belief that disclosure is medically contraindicated creates a conflict between the physician’s obligations to promote patient welfare and to respect patient autonomy.’ A study in 2001 found that 59% of psychiatrists disclosed a schizophrenia diagnosis after a first episode and 42% for personality disorders. Despite borderline personality disorder (BPD) being a well-established diagnosis with treatments available, many practitioners still do not disclose or document a patient's BPD diagnoses on their file. A common justification for non-disclosure to the patient is concern that stigma or an exacerbation of the patient's symptoms as a result of disclosure will cause serious harm to the individual.

== Therapeutic privilege in a multidisciplinary team ==
Doctors are often involved in a multidisciplinary team such as with nurses who have their own legal and ethical duties and are independently accountable for their own actions. Given this and that ‘the extent to which this therapeutic privilege extends to the rest of the health care teams has not been expressly examined either within case law or literature’, it is suggested that further clarity is needed as to how therapeutic privilege extends to the rest of the team. Moreover, in cases where other members of the team do not agree with the doctor's decision to uphold therapeutic privilege, it is argued that it places this healthcare practitioner in a compromised position and ‘there is no legal and professional guidance discussing therapeutic privilege in relation to the nurse and the potential issues this could create within the health care team.’

== Pregnancy and childbirth ==
Pregnancy and the post-partum period are contexts particularly relevant to therapeutic privilege given the heightened risk as discussed by Finnerty who states that ‘first, the nature of childbirth as a situation of heightened stress, pain and emotional distress may result in therapeutic privilege being used more in that context than in other healthcare encounters.’ Other relevant criticisms discussed of therapeutic privilege in the context of pregnancy include pregnancy being a long process providing sufficient opportunity to provide the patient with information as well as birth presenting a scenario of heightened practitioner-patient power imbalance where therapeutic privilege can have a negative impact on the birthing experience, risking negative patient-doctor relationships

== Notable cases ==
The Hii Chii Kok v London Lucien Ooi case considered many aspects of therapeutic privilege which despite this Court of Appeal Decision occurring in Singapore, contained considerations that can be applied universally. Acknowledging the difficulty of defining a clear binary between impaired and capable patients, the Singapore Court of Appeal introduced what is now called a Novel Interpretation of Therapeutic Privilege (Novel Therapeutic Privilege). The court ruled that therapeutic privilege can be upheld where the patient is not mentally impaired, but may refuse beneficial treatment because they do not fully understand it considering the following conditions are met; ‘(a) the benefit of the treatment to the patient; (b) the relatively low level of risk presented; and (c) the probability that even with suitable assistance, the patient would likely refuse such treatment owing to some misapprehension of the information stemming from the patient.’. These patients may be referred to as having compromised capacity and considered to have ‘limited insight into the implications of treatment opinions and may be at risk of making decisions that many would consider contrary to their best interests and reflecting insufficient understanding’. Examples given by the court included geriatric patients and those with anxiety disorders, whose state of mind may prohibit understanding the true reality of low-risk treatments which are safe and provide an advantage to the patient and therefore therapeutic privilege should 'extend to cases where although patients have mental capacity, their decision-making capabilities are impaired to an appreciable degree.’. Prior to this ruling, the Bolam Test approach was utilized which prioritised doctors and states that, ‘a doctor is not negligent if he can show that his practice accorded with a substantial and respectable body of medical opinion in his field – applied to all three aspects of a doctor’s work, namely, diagnosis, advice and treatment’.

Recognising that therapeutic privilege provides doctors with a significant amount of power over the patient, the court of the Montgomery v Lanarkshire Health Board 2015 case ruled therapeutic privilege ‘is not intended to subvert that principle by enabling the doctor to prevent the patient from making an informed choice where she is liable to make a choice which the doctor considers to be contrary to her best interests.’. The Montgomery v Lanarkshire Health Board (2015) case uses the term ‘therapeutic exception’ instead of ‘therapeutic privilege’ as they emphasized the extreme conditions required for its use. In this case the Supreme Court ruled that ‘The doctor is however entitled to withhold from the patient information as to a risk if he reasonably considers that its disclosure would be seriously detrimental to the patient’s health.’. This came after a doctor failed to disclose to a patient the risk to their baby of shoulder dystocia in a vaginal delivery, which eventuated in her birth. The patient states that had she known the risk, she would have rather had a caesarean section.

== Australia ==
In New South Wales, practitioners are permitted to withhold information in 2 cases: 1) Where a patient has explicitly requested to have information withheld from them and have directed a doctor to act on their behalf and 2) in the case of therapeutic privilege. Therapeutic privilege in NSW is considered a scenario where ‘Information could be withheld in rare circumstances where the Medical Practitioner holds a reasonable belief that providing information would be damaging to the patient’s health’. Conditions where therapeutic privilege may be permitted are listed as ‘the patient’s personality, temperament or attitude; their level of understanding; the nature of the treatment and the likelihood of adverse effects resulting from the treatment.’. Doctors are advised to discuss with colleagues before making the decision to withhold information from the patient. Under the Guardianship Act 1987, it is illegal to withhold information from a guardian or person making decisions on behalf of the patient. In cases where practitioners are uncertain about whether they can withhold information from a patient, they are encouraged to consult advice from their local Director of Medical Services or the Ministry of Health Legal Branch.
